= Operation Cowboy =

1945 battle of World War II

Coordinates: 49°33′38″N 12°46′9″E

- Part of the Western Front of World War II
Date	28 April 1945
Location	Hostau, Sudetenland
Result	Allied success: Many POWs freed

Belligerents
United States; Wehrmacht POWs; Allied POWs; 1st SS Cossack Cavalry Division deserters	Germany: Waffen-SS

Commanders and leaders
(United States) Captain Thomas M. Stewart; (United States) Major Robert P. Andrews; Lt.Col. Walter Holters; Lt.Col. Hubert Rudofsky	Standartenführer Hans Kempin

Units involved
(United States) 42nd Cavalry Reconnaissance Squadron 2nd Cavalry Group XII Corps	32nd SS Volunteer Grenadier Division

Strength
325	Unknown, but greater than the opposing force

Casualties and losses
Several killed or wounded	100+ killed 100+ wounded

Operation Cowboy was fought in the town of Hostau, Sudetenland (now Hostouň in the Czech Republic), on 28 April 1945, in the last days of fighting in the European theater of World War II. It is one of two known incidents during the war in which Americans and Germans of the Wehrmacht fought side by side against the Waffen-SS, the other being the Battle of Castle Itter.

== Background ==
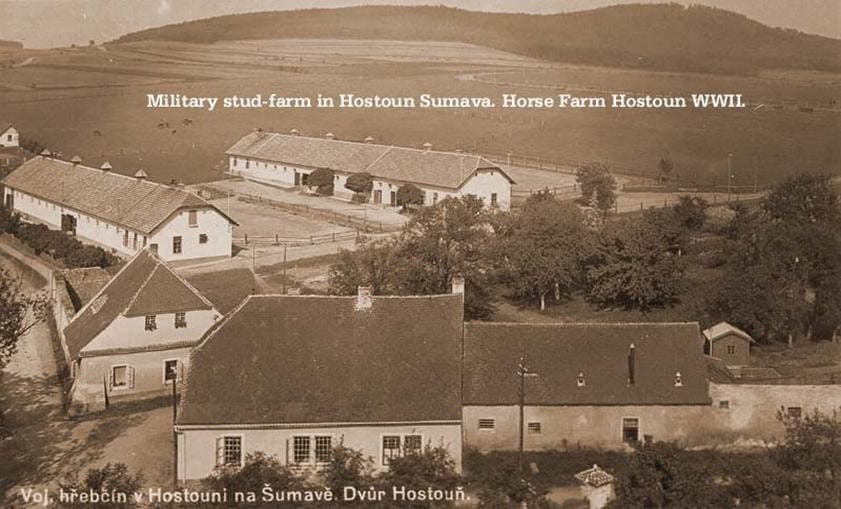
Experimental Farm in Hostau

After the annexation of Austria to Nazi Germany in 1938, the Lipizzaner Breeding Mares of the Spanish Riding School in Vienna were transferred to an experimental farm in the town of Hostau, in Nazi-occupied Czechoslovakia. The goal was to create a race of "Aryan horses". The head of the Spanish Riding School, Alois Podhajsky, was a famed German horseman and dressage expert as well as a bronze medallist at the 1936 Olympics. He had also been an Austrian Army colonel, and by 1938 had been enrolled in the Wehrmacht with the rank of major.

In the final phases of World War II, Hostau was on the advancing path of the Soviet Red Army from the East, and the German soldiers on the farm were unenthusiastic about surrendering to the Russians. On the other side, to the West, the XII Corps of the American Third Army was also advancing towards the farm, commanded by General George Patton, racing with the Soviets for the liberation of Prague.

The morale of the situation was already incredibly low as refugees, out of desperation and starvation, attempted to raid the farm to steal the horses for their meat. The soldiers anxiously waited for when the Soviet Red Army would sweep through Hostau and promptly kill the horses for the food or work the animals to death.

== Prelude ==
German veterinarians at the farm, commanded by Lieutenant Colonel Hubert Rudofsky, were afraid that the Soviets would kill their horses, since during the liberation of Hungary they had already killed the whole Royal Hungarian Lipizzaner collection. Luftwaffe intelligence officer Lieutenant Colonel Walter Holters, not part of the farm personnel but forced there due to a fuel shortage, tried to arrange an agreement with the advancing US troops. Holters, a general staff officer, was senior to Rudofsky but they agreed about saving the precious horses. Contact was made with the nearest US unit in the area, the 42nd Cavalry Reconnaissance Squadron of the 2nd Cavalry Group. The 2nd Cavalry Group, commanded by Colonel Charles H. Reed, was famous for its daring deep strikes. The unit was known among German troops as the "Ghosts of Patton's Army". Despite being a mechanized unit, many of the officers of the Group were horsemen and had served in mounted units before the mechanization. They immediately planned an operation to rescue the horses.

A meeting between Patton and Podhajsky about a rescue operation of the horses apparently took place. A source states that the meeting between Holters and Reed was not casual, but planned before 26 April.

The operation was not simple for several reasons. First, German troops at the Czech border were not parties to the agreement and would likely oppose the American troops entering the area. Second, many of the hundreds of horses were pregnant. Most of the rest had just given birth. Also, Czechoslovakia had been posted in the Soviet area of influence during the Yalta Conference. The advancing Red Army would likely not have agreed with the operation, had they reached the farm in time.

== The operation ==
General Patton, who agreed to the operation, gave orders to quickly create a task force, but available troops were scarce. Assigned were two small cavalry reconnaissance troops with M8 scout cars, some M8 howitzer motor carriages and two M24 Chaffee light tanks and a screening infantry force of 325 men. The task force was commanded by Major Robert P. Andrews. The path to the farm was 20 miles long, into still German-occupied territory. Thousands of German troops, including two understrength armoured divisions, were still present. Among them was the 11th Panzer Division that a few days later would surrender at Passau.

After having passed German defences at the border, with the help of an artillery barrage by the XII Corps, Andrews secured the farm. He was then confronted with the task of evacuating the horses. As the horses outnumbered the men in the task force, Andrews enrolled many Allied POWs, including British, New Zealanders, French, Poles and Serbs, who were freed from concentration camps in the area. Andrews also gave arms to the German soldiers of the Heer and the Luftwaffe, even if they were formally prisoners of war. He also accepted the help of a Russian anticommunist Cossack, Prince Amassov. Amassov led a small force of Cossack cavalry that had deserted the German 1st Cossack Cavalry Division and was present in the area.

After arriving at the farm, Colonel Reed looked for vehicles to move the pregnant horses and new-born foals. Meanwhile Major Andrews turned over the task force to his deputy, Captain Thomas M. Stewart. Before being able to evacuate the farm the composite force was attacked twice by Waffen-SS infantry. Both attacks were repelled with some dead and wounded. The SS unit suffered more losses and eventually retreated. Immediately afterwards, Stewart managed to evacuate the horses. Some horses were mounted and the rest were herded, leaving just as the first Soviet T-34 appeared in sight. The Soviets did not oppose the evacuation. The operation was concluded when all the horses were loaded into trucks near the border and secured behind American lines.

== In popular culture ==
The 1963 American adventure war film Miracle of the White Stallions released by Walt Disney, is loosely based on Operation Cowboy. Several non-fiction books have been published on the topic of Operation Cowboy including:

- 1945: Rettung der Lipizzaner, Wagnis oder Wunder by Brigitte Peter, which contains many original interviews with survivors of the events
- Operation Cowboy: The Secret American Mission to Save the World’s Most Beautiful Horses in the Last Days of World War II by Stephen Talty
- Ghost Riders: Operation Cowboy, the World War Two Mission to Save the World's Finest Horses by Mark Felton
- The Perfect Horse by Elizabeth Betts
