= Stadlern =

- Municipality
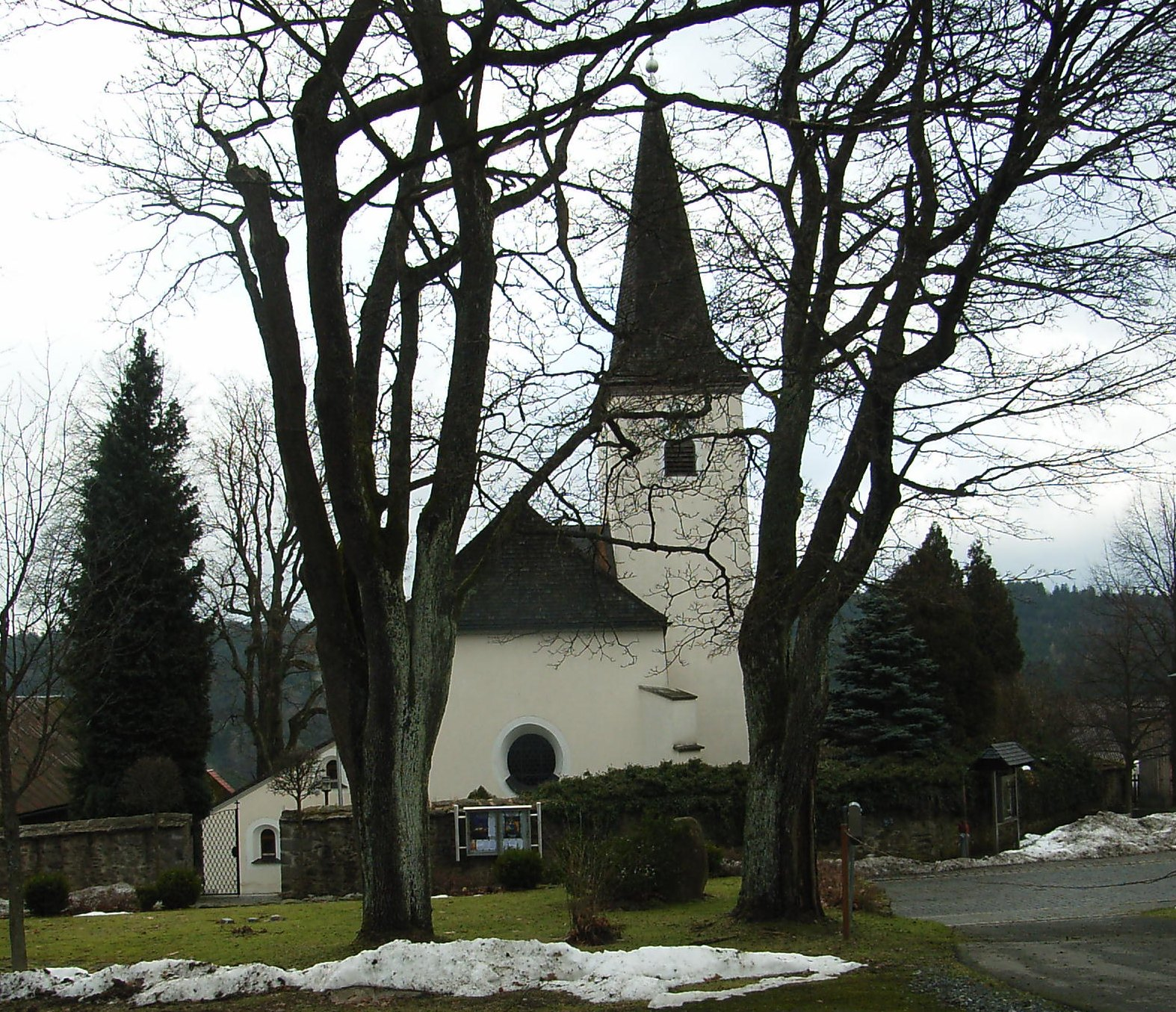

- Location of Stadlern within Schwandorf district
- Interactive map of Stadlern
- Location within Germany Location within Bavaria
- Coordinates: 49°30′N 12°37′E
- Country: Germany
- State: Bavaria
- Admin. region: Oberpfalz
- District: Schwandorf
- Municipal assoc.: Schönsee

Government
  - Mayor (2020–26): Gerald Reiter

Area
  - Total: 10.55 km^{2} (4.07 sq mi)
- Elevation: 708 m (2,323 ft)

Population (2025-12-31)
  - Total: 534
  - Density: 50.6/km^{2} (131/sq mi)
- Time zone: UTC+01:00 (CET)
  - Summer (DST): UTC+02:00 (CEST)
- Postal codes: 92549
- Dialling codes: 0 96 74
- Vehicle registration: SAD
- Website: www.schoenseer-land.de

Stadlern is a municipality in the district of Schwandorf in Bavaria, Germany.

== History ==
In the 11th century the castle of Reichenstein was the center of the settlement of the region around Stadlern. It was built under the reign of Charlemagne or his successors to fortify the Bavarian Nordgau (now Upper Palatinate). Stadlern was a little settlement beneath the castle where the servants of the castle lived. 1266 Ottokar II of Bohemia conquered and devastated the whole region. After that Reichenstein with Stadlern belonged to Bohemia to the earls of Hostau. 1333 the Stadlern was sold to earl Ulrich of Leuchtenberg - this is where Stadlern is for the first time mentioned in written form. 1425 and 1431 ravaged the Hussites Stadlern. Stadlern changed often its owner and was eventually 1803 sold to the earl of Du Moulin-Eckart to whom it belongs until today. All these centuries Stadlern was inhabited by Bavarians but was a Bohemian fief. Finally as a result of the Peace of Pressburg in 1805 Stadlern came to Bavaria.

== Geography ==
Stadlern is located on the western hillsides of the mountain Reichenstein. In its west is the Schnabelloh-Creek with the mills Bemmerlmühle, Stadlermühle and Tabakmühle. Across the Schnabelloh-Creek at the eastern hillside of the Drechselberg is the hamlet Reichenberg. In its east is the river Bayerische Schwarzach with the villages Waldhäuser and Schwarzach and the mill Neumühle and the village Charlottenthal.

== Villages and Hamlets ==
- Bemmerlmühle
- Charlottenthal
- Neumühle
- Reichenberg
- Schwarzach
- Stadlermühl
- Stadlern
- Tabakmühle
- Waldhäuser

== Neighbouring communities ==
The neighbouring communities clockwise: Bělá nad Radbuzou, Rybník nad Radbuzou, Tiefenbach, Weiding, Schönsee.

== Religion ==
The parish Stadlern is first mentioned in 1363. Maybe there was at this time a church, which was destroyed in the above mentioned battle of Ottokar II of Bohemia. The current church was built around 1400. The gothic choir is completely conserved with two Ribbed vaults. The nave was destroyed by the Hussites in 1431. Perhaps in this difficult times started the pilgrimage "Zu Unserer Lieben Frau aus Erden gebrannt" (To Our Lady Burnt From Earth). This name originates from a gothic madonna burnt from clay, who until today is worshiped on the high altar. 1526 - 1627 Stadlern changed five times its religion between Lutheranism and Calvinism according to the religion of its dominion. In this times the church of Stadlern was closed, but the pilgrimage persisted nevertheless. 1627/28 under the reign of prince-elector Maximilian I, Elector of Bavaria Stadlern became catholic again. 1700 - 1760 the nave was rebuilt and a precious decoration in baroque style was added. Until today at 15. August is a great holy mass to which pilgrims from all directions walk to Stadlern.

== Bibliography ==
- Teresa Guggenmoos: Stadt Schönsee. Verlag der Stadt Schönsee, Schönsee 1981
- Heribert Batzl (Hrsg.): Der Landkreis Oberviechtach in Vergangenheit und Gegenwart. Verlag für Behörden und Wirtschaft R. Alfred Hoeppner, Aßling/Obb. und München 1970
- Franz Liebl, Heimatkreis Bischofteinitz (Hrsg.): Unser Heimatkreis Bischofteinitz. Brönner & Daentler KG, Eichstätt 1967
- Andreas Lesser (Hrsg.): Stadlern im Oberpfälzer Wald. Forstner GmbH, Oberviechtach 2000, ISBN 3-00-006390-0
- Marianne Popp: Mariä Himmelfahrt Stadlern. Verlag Schnell & Steiner GmbH, Regensburg 1997, ISBN 3-7954-4067-X (Schnell, Kunstführer Nr. 2286)
