= 38th SS Grenadier Division Nibelungen =

German infantry division

38th SS-Grenadier-Division "Nibelungen"
- 38. SS-Grenadier-Division "Nibelungen"
- Emblem of the division
- Active: March–May 1945
- Country: Nazi Germany
- Branch: Waffen-SS
- Type: Infantry
- Size: Division of 6,000 personnel
- Part of: XIII SS Army Corps
- Engagements: Second World War; Defense of the Homeland

The 38th SS Grenadier Division Nibelungen (German: 38. SS-Grenadier-Division "Nibelungen") was a World War II infantry division of the Waffen-SS, the military wing of the German Nazi Party. Formed in April 1945, it was the last Waffen-SS division created during the war.

== History ==
The 38th SS-Grenadier Division 'Nibelungen' was formed in April 1945 from the Junker School in Bad Tölz, Bavaria with three SS grenadier regiments. The division consisted of personnel drawn from the 6th SS Mountain Division Nord, 7th SS Volunteer Mountain Division Prinz Eugen, and 30th Waffen Grenadier Division of the SS (1st Belarusian). There were also two battalions of border guards, an element of the Reichsführer-SS escort battalion, and a cadre of local Hitler Youth.

The division reached a strength of around 5,000 men, with the divisional battalions available in platoon or company strength. On 16 April 1945 the 6th SS Anti-Tank Battalion of 6th SS Mountain Division Nord was reorganised as the 38th SS Anti-Tank Battalion and incorporated into the new division. The SS Artillery Training Regiment in Benešov was reorganised as the 38th SS Artillery Regiment and incorporated shortly thereafter.

On 17 April 1945, the division moved to Titisee-Neustadt in Gau Württemberg-Hohenzollern, and then to Dachau, Bavaria without any previous training in the divisional framework. Here the units of the division were assigned to the XIII SS Army Corps and relocated to the Danube Front, where they arrived on 21 April. The next day, American troops captured Neumarkt in der Oberpfalz in the Upper Palatinate and pushed German units back onto the Danube, where they still held bridgeheads. Here the division was reinforced by a light artillery division of the 26th Waffen Grenadier Division of the SS (2nd Hungarian).

Until 28 April, the division offered fierce resistance to the advancing Americans, before the bulk of XIII SS Army Corps moved south towards Landshut, where the new defensive front was formed as the Isar river. A combat group made up of members of the French SS Grenadier Training and Replacement Battalion joined the division in Moosburg an der Isar. At the beginning of May, the division withdrew via Wasserburg am Bodensee and Lake Chiemsee towards Traunstein, only to surrender to American troops on 8 May 1945 in Reit im Winkl.

== Composition ==
The following units served in the division:

- Divisional Staff
- 38th SS Signal Company
- 95th SS Grenadier Regiment
- 96th SS Grenadier Regiment
- 97th SS Grenadier Regiment
- 2 x Border Guard Battalions
- Reichsführer-SS Escort Battalion
- Hitler Youth Division
- 38th SS Artillery Regiment
- 38th SS Anti-Tank Division
- 38th SS Engineer Company
- 38th SS Divisional Supply Troops

== Commanders ==
Commanders of the division included:

- SS-Standartenführer Hans Kempin (1 March 1945 – 27 March 1945)
- SS-Obersturmbannführer Richard Schulze-Kossens (27 March 1945 – 12 April 1945)
- SS-Standartenführer Martin Stange (12 April 1945 – surrender)

== See also ==
- List of German divisions in World War II
- List of Waffen-SS divisions
- List of SS personnel
