= Richard Schulze-Kossens =

SS officer and commander (1914–1988)

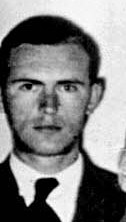
- Born: 2 October 1914; Spandau, Berlin, Germany
- Died: 3 July 1988 (aged 73); Düsseldorf, West Germany
- Military career
- Allegiance: Nazi Germany
- Branch: Waffen-SS
- Service years: 1934–1945
- Rank: SS-Obersturmbannführer
- Units: LSSAH; Führerbegleitkommando
- Commands: SS Division Nibelungen

Richard Schulze-Kossens (2 October 1914 – 3 July 1988, born "Richard Schulze") was a Nazi Party member and Schutzstaffel (SS) commander during the Nazi era. Before and during World War II, he served as a personal adjutant to foreign minister Joachim von Ribbentrop. He also served at different intervals, as an ordinance officer and SS adjutant for Adolf Hitler and later commanded the SS Division Nibelungen, SS-Junkerschule Bad Tölz. After the war in Europe ended, he was held in an American internment camp for three years and died in 1988.

== SS career ==
Richard Schulze was born in Spandau, Berlin. A year after graduating from gymnasium in 1934, the 20-year-old Schulze entered the Allgemeine SS and was assigned to 6.SS-Standarte in Berlin. In November 1934, he served in the Leibstandarte SS Adolf Hitler (LSSAH), one of Adolf Hitler's SS bodyguard units. Between 1935 and 1937 took various officer training courses at the SS-Junkerschule Bad Tölz, in Jüterbog and Dachau. In May 1937, Schulze became a member of the Nazi Party. Schulze served as personal adjutant to Foreign Minister Joachim von Ribbentrop from April 1939 until January 1941. Schulze is pictured standing with Molotov, Ribbentrop, Stalin and Soviet Chief of Staff Shaposnikov at the signing of the Molotov–Ribbentrop Pact of 23 August 1939.

From October 1941 and at intervals thereafter, he was an SS ordinance officer and SS adjutant for Adolf Hitler. While serving in these roles, Schulze was also a member of the Führerbegleitkommando (FBK), which provided personal security for Hitler. In December 1942, Hitler transferred some of the command authority of the FBK to Schulze. He was placed in charge of administration, guidelines for training, discipline, deployment and transfer of members of the unit. By 1944, he was promoted to the rank of SS-Obersturmbannführer (lieutenant colonel). He became the divisional commander of the 38th SS Division Nibelungen in 1945. At that time, Schulze was the commanding officer of the SS-Brigade Nibelungen and the SS cadet training school at Bad Tölz.

== Later life ==
After the Second World War ended, Schulze changed his name to "Richard Schulze-Kossens". He was held in an American internment camp for three years. After being released, he worked as a salesman and wrote several books.

He remained in contact with a group of former adjutants, secretaries and other staff members who continued to have a favourable view of Hitler following the end of the war. Schulze-Kossens died of lung cancer on 3 July 1988. More than 100 former SS members attended his funeral, with many wearing the insignia of an SS veterans association, and his casket was draped with tributes from former SS units. Werner Grothmann and two former Nazi officers provided eulogies.

Military offices
Preceded by SS-Standartenführer Hans Kempin	Commander of SS Division Nibelungen; 6 April 1945 – 9 April 1945	Succeeded by SS-Gruppenführer Heinz Lammerding
