= Hans Kempin =

German SS officer

- Born: 7 June 1913; Berlin-Lichtenberg
- Died: 30 November 1992 (aged 79)
- Military career
- Allegiance: Germany
- Branch: Waffen-SS
- Service years: 1931–1945
- Rank: Standartenführer
- Units: Leibstandarte-SS Adolf Hitler; SS-Standarte Deutschland; SS-Regiment Der Führer.
- Commands: 547. Volksgrenadier-Division; 32.SS-Freiwilligen-Grenadier-Division 30.Januar; 38. SS-Grenadierdivision Nibelungen; Waffen-SS, Unterführerschule, Laibach (Ljubljana)
- Awards: Iron Cross 1st Class; Iron Cross 2nd Class

SS-Standartenführer (Colonel) Hans Wilhelm Kempin (7 June 1913 – 30 November 1992) was a German Waffen-SS combat and training officer who served in the SS-Standarte Deutschland, SS-Regiment Der Führer and later commanded the 547. Volksgrenadier-Division, 38. SS-Grenadierdivision Nibelungen, 32.SS-Freiwilligen-Grenadier-Division 30.Januar, and the Waffen-SS Unterführerschule in Laibach (Ljubljana).

== Early life and prewar SS service ==
Kempin, a son of businessman Willi Kempin, was born in Berlin-Lichtenberg. After graduating from the Hohenzollern Gymnasium in Schwedt in 1928, Hans worked as a banker. In September 1930, he joined Sturmabteilung, or the SA, and in December of the same year also the NSDAP. After two years as an SA member, in July 1932, the 19-year-old Kempin entered the SS-VT and was given the rank SS-Anwärter (Candidate). In October 1933, Kempin was assigned to the premier SS-VT division Leibstandarte-SS Adolf Hitler and then sent to the new SS-Junkerschule at Bad Tölz. After his graduation he served with the SS-Standarte Deutschland and later was given command at the SS-Junkerschule Braunschweig. In 1938, he was transferred back to SS-Standarte Deutschland and remained with this unit until March 1941.

== World War II service ==
With the SS-Standarte Deutschland, SS–Hauptsturmführer (Captain) Kempin participated in the invasion of Poland and the subsequent operations in the West; receiving both classes of the Iron Cross. Kempin remained with this unit until March 1941 when he was transferred to the SS-Regiment Der Führer where he served first with the 13. Kompanie and later with the II. Battalion under future SS-Brigadeführer Heinz Harmel. On 3 September 1941 he was seriously wounded by shrapnel from a grenade and was hospitalized until December 1941. After recovering from his injuries, Kempin returned to the field with the Der Führer. However, on 1 February 1942 instead of continuing on with his old regiment, Kempin was transferred as an instructor to the SS-Junkerschule at Bad Tölz and later also to SS-Junkerschule Braunschweig, and finally to Waffen-SS Unterführerschule in Posen-Treskau. On 1 December 1943, he was promoted to SS-Obersturmbannführer (lieutenant colonel) and two months later received command of the Waffen-SS Unterführerschule located in Laibach (Ljubljana). He remained its commander until late February 1945, when he was assigned to lead first the 547. Volksgrenadier-Division then the newly formed 38. SS-Grenadierdivision Nibelungen (the name Nibelungen comes from German mythology, and finally the 32. SS-Freiwilligen-Grenadier-Division 30.Januar. Together with the remnants of 30. Januar, SS-Standartenführer Hans Kempin surrendered to the Americans on 8 May 1945.

After the war he worked in agriculture and owned one of the most technically advanced farms in Germany. Kempin died on 30 November 1992 at the age of 79.

== Personal life ==
- On 25 July 1938, Kempin married Gustel Westphal, and together they had one son and one daughter.

== Summary of SS career ==
=== Dates of rank ===
- SS-Anwärter: July 1932
- SS-Mann: November 1932
- SS-Rottenführer: 1 December 1933
- SS-Hauptscharführer: 20 December 1934
- SS-Oberjunker: 20 December 1934
- SS-Untersturmführer: 20 April 1935
- SS-Obersturmführer: 20 April 1936
- SS-Hauptsturmführer: 15 August 1939
- SS-Sturmbannführer: 1 September 1941
- SS-Obersturmbannführer: 1 December 1943
- SS-Standartenführer: 1 March 1945

=== Decorations ===
(?) indicates date unknown

- Iron Cross Second (1940) and First (1940) Classes
- Sudetenland Medal with Prague Castle bar (?)
- Anschluss Medal (?)
- Infantry Assault Badge(1940)
- Wound Badge in Black (1940)
- War Merit Cross with Swords Second (?) and First (?) Classes
- SA-Sports Badge in Bronze (?)
- Waffen-SS Long Service Award (?)

Military offices
Preceded by none	Commander of 38. SS-Grenadierdivision Nibelungen; 1 March 1945 – 15 March 1945	Succeeded by SS-Obersturmbannführer Richard Schulze-Kossens
Preceded by SS-Oberführer Adolf Ax	Commander of 32.SS-Freiwilligen-Grenadier-Division 30.Januar; 15 March 1945 – 8 May 1945	Succeeded by none
