= Schönsee (Verwaltungsgemeinschaft) =

- Verwaltungsgemeinschaft
- Location of Schönsee within Schwandorf district
- Interactive map of Schönsee
- Location within Germany Location within Bavaria
- Coordinates: 49°31′N 12°33′E
- Country: Germany
- State: Bavaria
- Admin. region: Upper Palatinate
- District: Schwandorf
- Seat: Schönsee
- Subdivisions: 3 municipalities

Area
  - Total: 83.26 km^{2} (32.15 sq mi)

Population (2025-12-31)
  - Total: 3,206
  - Density: 38.51/km^{2} (99.73/sq mi)
- Time zone: UTC+01:00 (CET)
  - Summer (DST): UTC+02:00 (CEST)
- Website: www.vg-schoensee.de

Schönsee is a Verwaltungsgemeinschaft (municipal association) in the district of Schwandorf in Bavaria, Germany. Its seat is in Schönsee.

It consists of the following municipalities:

1. Schönsee
2. Stadlern
3. Weiding
