= Jan Adrian Łata =

Polish Catholic priest and philosopher

Jan Adrian Łata (born 7 March 1944 in Tarnów, Poland) was ordained in 1969. He is a Polish Catholic priest, theologian, and philosopher.

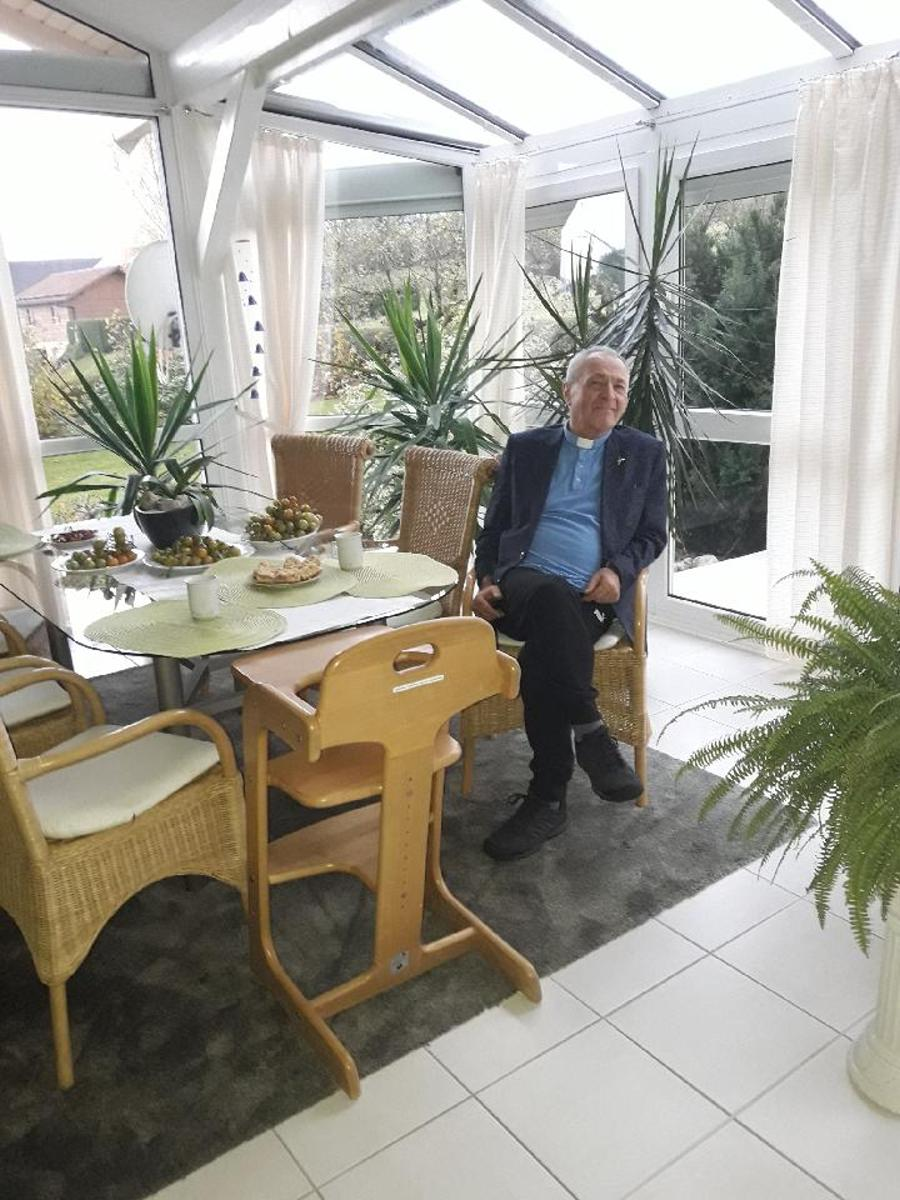
Jan Adrian Łata

Łata wrote his thesis about Paul Tillich. With his thesis and with numerous translations of books of Paul Tillich he helped to spread the ideas of protestantic Paul Tillich, Karl Barth, Dietrich Bonhoeffer and Rudolf Bultmann in catholic Poland. From 1991 to 2017 Łata worked in the little village Weiding, Germany, as a priest and wrote books about the situation of modern Christians. In 1994, Roman Catholic Metropolitan Archbishop Józef Życiński of the Archdiocese of Lublin awarded him the title canon. In 2017, Łata retired and returned to his native Poland.

== Writings ==
- Żyzna ziemia pod zasiew, Lublin 2026, ISBN 9788384280287.
- Miscellanea, Polihymnia, Lublin 2024, ISBN 9788378478997.
- Religioni et Litteris, Polihymnia, Lublin 2020, ISBN 9788378477037.
- Skończoność i Wyobcowanie współczesnego Człowieka (english: Finality and Alienation of the Modern Man). Polihymnia, Lublin 2017, ISBN 978-83-7847-452-4.
- Lęk przed pustką i bezsensem (english: The fear of emptiness and futility). Polihymnia, Lublin 2016, ISBN 978-83-7847-362-6.
- Między autonomią a przynależnością (english: Between autonomie and affiliation). Polihymnia, Lublin 2015, ISBN 978-83-7847-280-3.
- Chodźże o własnych siłach (english: Go with your own power!). Polihymnia, Lublin 2014, ISBN 978-83-7847-183-7.
- Nie glina w glinę ... (literally: Not clay to clay. The meaning is: Don't tell always the same things). Polihymnia, Lublin 2013, ISBN 978-83-7847-073-1.
- Pogoń za nową teonomią (Autonomy, Heteronomy or Theonomy). Polihymnia, Lublin 2012, ISBN 978-83-7847-007-6.
- Więdnące Liście (Withering leaves). Polihymnia, Lublin 2011, ISBN 978-83-7270-819-9.
- Ostateczna Troska Człowieka (The last trouble of men). Zakład Poligraficzny Z. Gajek, Wrocław 2000, ISBN 83-88308-20-3.
- Zdrojów Mojżeszowych Laska (The source of Moses love). Oficina Wydawnica „Signum“, Wrocław 1998, ISBN 83-85631-72-0.
- Moc, która pokonuje niebyt (The power to get over the nothingness). CBS-Service, Wrocław 1996, ISBN 83-901051-4-4.
- Odpowiadająca teologia Paula Tillicha (Answer to the theology of Paul Tillich). Oficina Wydawnica „Signum“, Oleśnica 1995, ISBN 83-85631-38-0.

== Translations of Paul Tillich into Polish ==
- Paul Tillich: Rzeczywistość Objawienia. Oficina Wydawnica „Signum“, Oleśnica 1998, ISBN 83-85631-58-5. (Reality of appearances. In: Systematic Theology. vol. I, University of Chicago, Chicago 1951)
- Paul Tillich: Rzeczywistość Chrystusa Nowy Byt. Oficina Wydawnica „Signum“, Oleśnica 1996, ISBN 83-85631-54-2. (Reality of Christ.. In: Systematic Theology. vol. II, University of Chicago, Chicago 1957)
- Paul Tillich: Egzystencja i oczekiwanie Chrystusa. Oficina Wydawnica „Signum“, Oleśnica 1996, ISBN 83-85631-55-0. (Existence and Christ.. In: Systematic Theology. vol. II, University of Chicago, Chicago 1957)
- Paul Tillich: Prawda jest w głębi. Oficina Wydawnica „Signum“, Oleśnica 1996, ISBN 83-85631-40-2. (In the depth is truth. Berlin/ New York 1987)
