= Alois Podhajsky =

Austrian equestrian (1898–1973)

Director of the Spanish Riding School
- In office 1939–1965

Personal details
- Born: 24 February 1898 Mostar, Austria-Hungary
- Died: 23 May 1973 (aged 75) Vienna, Austria

Olympic medal record

Equestrian

Representing Austria
Bronze medal – third place	1936 Berlin	Dressage individual

Alois Podhajsky (24 February 1898 – 23 May 1973) was an Austrian military officer, Olympic rider, and long-serving director of the Spanish Riding School of Vienna. He is known for his work in classical horsemanship and for his role in maintaining the Lipizzan breed and the traditions of haute école. Podhajsky wrote several books on dressage and training, and during the Second World War he oversaw efforts to protect the Spanish Riding School and its horses.

== Career ==
Podhajsky was born in Mostar, Bosnia and Herzegovina, and was an officer in the Austrian Army, rising to the rank of colonel. In 1939, Podhajsky became chief of the Academy of Classical Horsemanship, better known as the Spanish Riding School of Vienna. Founded in 1572, the school's main focus was the training of Lipizzan horses in the art of classical dressage. Podhajsky competed in dressage at the 1936 Summer Olympics and the 1948 Summer Olympics, winning a bronze medal in 1936. Podhajsky was director of the school throughout World War II and continued in the position until his retirement in 1965. Following his retirement, he continued to teach classical horsemanship, and wrote a number of books on the topic. Podhajsky died following a stroke in 1973, in Vienna, Austria.

== Relocation during World War II ==
During World War II, worried for the safety of the school and the horses due to bombing raids on Vienna, Podhajsky evacuated most of the stallions out of the city to Sankt Martin im Innkreis in Upper Austria. A number of mares from the Piber Federal Stud, the breeding farm that supplied horses for the school, were also evacuated.

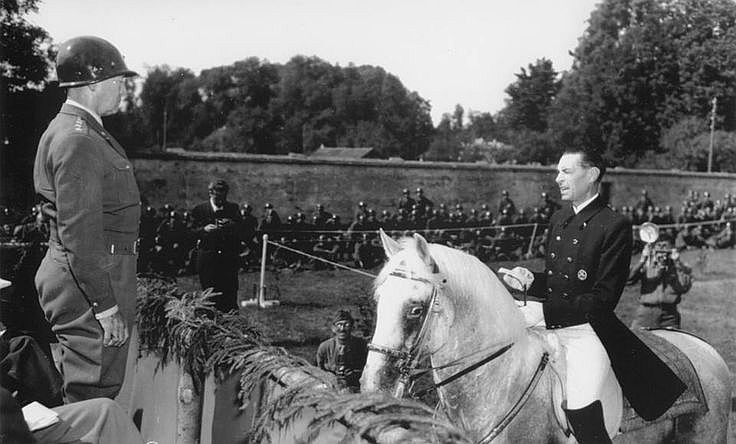
Patton and Podhajsky, 1945

Though the horses were in relative safety, there were still harsh challenges; there was little food for human or animals, and starving refugees sometimes attempted to steal the horses, viewing them as a source of meat. As American General George Patton was leading his troops through Austria, he was alerted to the presence of the Lipizzans in Sankt Martin im Innkreis. Patton and Podhajsky had each competed in equestrian events at the Olympic Games. The two men renewed their acquaintance, and after Podhajsky orchestrated an impressive performance by the remaining horses and riders of the school in front of Patton (a lifelong horseman) and Undersecretary of War Robert P. Patterson, the Americans agreed to place the stallions under the protection of the United States for the duration of the war. Podhajsky later wrote about these events, an account which was made into a motion picture Miracle of the White Stallions by Walt Disney studios, with actor Robert Taylor playing Colonel Podhajsky.

Podhajsky alerted Patton to the location of additional Lipizzan bloodstock. Many Lipizzan mares and some stallions had been appropriated by the Germans from the Austrian breeding farm at Piber and sent to Hostau, to a Nazi-run stud farm in Czechoslovakia (now the Czech Republic). When Hostau fell behind Soviet lines, captured German officers, under interrogation by U.S. Army Captain Ferdinand Sperl, provided details on the Lipizzans' location and asked the Americans to rescue the horses before they fell into Soviet hands, because it was feared they would be slaughtered for horsemeat. Patton issued orders, and on 28 April 1945 Colonel Charles H. Reed, with members of Troops A, C and F of the 2nd Cavalry Regiment, conducted a raid behind Soviet lines, accepted the surrender of the Germans at Hostau, and evacuated the horses. The Lipizzans were relocated to Wels, then to Wimsbach, Upper Austria.

After the war, the Lipizzan stallions finally returned to Vienna in the autumn of 1955.

== Legacy ==
Podhajsky is remembered most for saving the Lipizzans, preserving their history following the war, as well as for his dedication to the advancement of classical dressage, and his contributions to the Spanish Riding School.

We must live for the school. Offer our lives to it. Then, perhaps, little by little, the light will grow from the tiny candle we keep lit here, and the great art—of the haute école—will not be snuffed out.

— Alois Podhajsky

He was awarded Order of Saint Sava.

- Walt Disney make a 1963 moive Miracle of the White Stallions about Alois Podhajsky.

== Works ==
- Podhajsky, Alois (1948). The Spanish Riding School. Vienna: R.H. Hammer.
- Podhajsky, Alois (1985) [1963]. The White Stallions of Vienna. City: Nymphenburger Verlagshandlung. ISBN 0948253037.
- Podhajsky, Alois (1965). My Dancing White Horses: The Autobiography of Alois Podhajsky. City: Holt, Rinehart, and Winston. ASIN B000WSHVZM.
- Podhajsky, Alois (1967). The Complete Training of Horse and Rider. The Sportsman's Press. p. 292 pages. ISBN 0-948253-51-7.
- Podhajsky, Alois (1969). The Lipizzaners. Garden City: Doubleday. ISBN 978-0-385-02807-3.
- Podhajsky, Alois (1976). The Art of Dressage. Garden City: Doubleday. ISBN 0-385-01552-6.
- Podhajsky, Alois (1993). The Riding Teacher: A Basic Guide to Correct Methods of Classical Instruction. North Pomfret, Vt: Trafalgar Square Publishing. p. 204 pages. ISBN 0-943955-84-X.
- Podhajsky, Alois (1997). My Horses, My Teachers. North Pomfret, Vt: Trafalgar Square Publishing. p. 202 pages. ISBN 1-57076-091-8.
- Podhajsky, Alois (2001). Meine Lehrmeister die Pferde. Erinnerungen an ein großes Reiterleben. German: Franckh-Kosmos Verlag. p. 224 pages. ISBN 3-440-08075-7.
