= Miracle of the White Stallions =

1963 film by Arthur Hiller

- Theatrical Film Poster
- Directed by: Arthur Hiller
- Written by: Alois Podhajsky; A. J. Carothers
- Based on: The Dancing White Horses of Vienna by Alois Podhajsky
- Produced by: Ron Miller; Walt Disney
- Starring: Robert Taylor; Lilli Palmer
- Cinematography: Günther Anders
- Edited by: Alfred Srp; Cotton Warburton
- Music by: Paul J. Smith
- Production company: Walt Disney Productions
- Distributed by: Buena Vista Distribution
- Release date: March 29, 1963 (U.S.)
- Running time: 118 minutes
- Country: United States
- Language: English
- Box office: $2,550,000 (US/ Canada)

Miracle of the White Stallions is a 1963 American adventure war film released by Walt Disney starring Robert Taylor (playing Alois Podhajsky), Lilli Palmer, and Eddie Albert. It is based on the story of Operation Cowboy which was the evacuation of 70 Lipizzaner horses from the Spanish Riding School in Vienna and retrieval of 300 Lipizzaner horses from a breeding farm in Czechoslovakia. The prized Lipizzaner horses were Austrian national treasures in danger of being used for food supply by the advancing Soviet Army during World War II. To gain Patton's aid, Podhajsky and his team from the Spanish Riding School of Vienna perform for Patton with their Lipizzaner stallions a precision dressage exhibition and the individual "Airs Above the Ground" with the hope Patton will see the value of horses and help rescue the mares and foals in Czechoslovakia.

Major parts of the movie were shot at the Hermesvilla palace in the Lainzer Tiergarten of Vienna, a former hunting area for the Habsburg nobility. The music for the soundtrack was based on the first movement of Franz Schubert's Marche Militaire no 1, D733.

The film states that The Spanish Riding School performed under the direction of Colonel Alois Podhajsky.

The film credits state that the film is based on the book The Dancing White Horses of Vienna by Colonel Alois Podhajsky.

== Plot ==
Lipizzaner horses, a breed since 1580, and the Spanish Riding School, founded in 1735, remain living Austrian treasures, though both are nearly lost during WWII. During the German occupation, Colonel Alois Podhajsky, who performed in dressage events in the 1936 Olympics and is the Riding School’s Director, becomes attached to the German Army. German headquarters replaces the Riding School’s civilian staff with military personnel. Defying orders to keep the horses at the school, Podhajsky sends a large number of Lipizzaner stallions to Czechoslovakia for safety (breeding mares had been evacuated previously), but retains 70 stallions in Vienna.

During the final desperate days of the war, SS General Streicher orders the Riding School staff to return to active military service to replace heavy troop losses, although Podhajsky is ordered to keep the school operating as normal with minimal staff. Podhajsky renews his request to evacuate from Vienna the Lipizzaner stallions, threatened by bombing. General Streicher denies the request, reasoning that evacuating the school will signal to the Viennese that the situation is hopeless and the city doomed. Podhajsky leaves without returning the "Heil Hitler" salute. Appealing to General Tellheim, who is realistic about impending defeat, Podhajsky is told to stretch the interpretation of permission to "evacuate treasures" such as paintings and statues to include horses.

At the train station Podhajsky has difficulty requisitioning six railcars until he arouses the dispatcher’s sentimentality and patriotism. The train is strafed by Allied planes, and the engine is ordered off without a load. Learning the stallions are on the unattached cars, the engineer defies orders and attaches the cars with the horses.

The Castle of St. Martins harbors hundreds of refugees as well as the Riding School. Pilfering by refugees is problematic, with bands stealing supplies and attempting to steal horses to flee from approaching Soviets. General Tellheim arrives with news that the Hungarian Riding school, captured by Soviets on the outskirts of Vienna, were taken prisoners of war and the horses destroyed. Tellheim de-militarizes the Spanish Riding School, hoping it will fare better as a civil institution when the Allies take over.

Contravening General Tellheim, a German officer arrives with orders for Podhajsky, the highest-ranking officer in the region, to become Defense Area Commander; men of the village are armed and awaiting his instructions. Before leaving, the officer informs Podhajsky the fight is not over and attempts at surrender to the Americans will bring severe punishment. Podhajsky orders the butcher—appointed his adjutant—to order the local men to protect the village against plundering by over 300 refugees, shielding untrained old and sick men from fighting seasoned soldiers. Podhajsky burns his orders, declares he is no longer in the army, and orders his staff to shed and burn their uniforms.

The Americans set up headquarters at the castle. Podhajsky asks the US Army's protection and to retrieve the breeding mares before the Soviets take over Czechoslovakia. After initially being refused by a general, Major Hoffman suggests that the School give a performance for General George S. Patton, (Note: Patton came from a wealthy and distinguished family, riding since childhood. Commissioned into the Cavalry, he represented the United States in the 1912 Olympics in the Modern pentathlon; one of its five events includes Show jumping. He designed the M1913 Cavalry saber (famed as the Patton saber), and went on to become the Cavalry's top instructor, then the Army's first "Master of the Sword". Always a devoted rider, even during wartime, he was known until his death for wearing riding breeches and boots as his distinct personal uniform.) who himself competed in dressage. Podhajsky and his men have only a couple of days to prepare the horses for the performance. Lower-ranking American soldiers who admire the horses help with preparations.

After General Patton watches the performance, Podhajsky asks for his protection and help in retrieving the mares from Czechoslovakia. Aware of 2000 Allied prisoners of war in Czechoslovakia being used to care for horses, Patton orders that the prisoners be liberated and the horses brought along too. Colonel Reed proposes Operation Cowboy to German Captain Danhoff: If the Germans surrender themselves and their prisoners to the Americans, within 48 hours the Americans will get the Germans and their families out of Czechoslovakia, away from the Soviets. Though Danhoff accepts the terms, SS troops ambush the American troops crossing the border and a battle ensues. In the village, Captain Danhoff and his men surrender, informing Colonel Reed that an insubordinate SS officer led the unauthorized attack. The 2,000 Allied prisoners are liberated along with 1,000 horses, among them the 300 Lipizzaners.

On the Spanish Riding School’s 220th anniversary, the Lipizzaner stallions give a special performance, attended by many of the individuals who helped save them.

== Cast ==
- Robert Taylor - Col. Alois Podhajsky
- Lilli Palmer - Vedena Podhajsky
- Curd Jürgens - Gen. Tellheim
- Eddie Albert - Rider Otto
- James Franciscus - Maj. Hoffman
- John Larch - Gen. George S. Patton
- Brigitte Horney - Countess Arco-Valley
- Philip Abbott - Col. Reed
- Douglas Fowley - General Walton Walker
- Charles Régnier - SS-Brigadeführer Streicher
- Fritz Wepper - Rider Hans
- Guenther Haenel - Groom Sascha
- Hans Habietinek - Innkeeper Hager
- Philo Hauser - Dispatcher
- Michael Janisch - Refugee Leader
- Max Haufler - Engineer
- Robert Dietl - German MP Captain
- Erik Schumann - German Capt. Danhoff
- Helmuth Janatsch - Intruder
- Michael Tellering - Streicher's Adjutant
- James Dobson - Southern GI

Alois Podhajsky: can be seen in the end gala performance, first just screen right of Robert Taylor, then just screen left.

== Comic book adaption ==
- Gold Key: Miracle of the White Stallions (June 1963)

== See also ==
- List of American films of 1963
- List of films about horses
