= Begleit-Bataillon Reichsführer-SS =

Begleit-Bataillon Reichsführer-SS was formed in May 1941 from Himmler's personal escort. The Begleit-Bataillon fought on the eastern front during Operation Barbarossa. Further, when SS-Brigadeführer Wilhelm Mohnke formed Kampfgruppe Mohnke (Battle Group Mohnke) during the Battle of Berlin it was made up in part by 600 men from this battalion.

== Composition ==
Composition – May 1941:

1. Schützen Kompanie
2. Schützen Kompanie
3. Schützen Kompanie
4. Maschinen Gewehr Kompanie
5. Infantrie Geschütz Kompanie
6. Panzerjäger Kompanie
7. Sturmgeschütz Kompanie
8. leichte Flak Batterie [2.0 cm]
9. schwere Flak Batterie [8.8 cm]

== Lineage ==
- Begleit-Bataillon Reichsführer-SS May 1941 - Feb 1943)
- Sturmbrigade Reichsführer SS (Feb 1943 - Oct 1943)
- 16th SS Panzergrenadier Division Reichsführer-SS (Oct 1943 - May 1945)
