= Weiding, Schwandorf =

Weiding
- Municipality
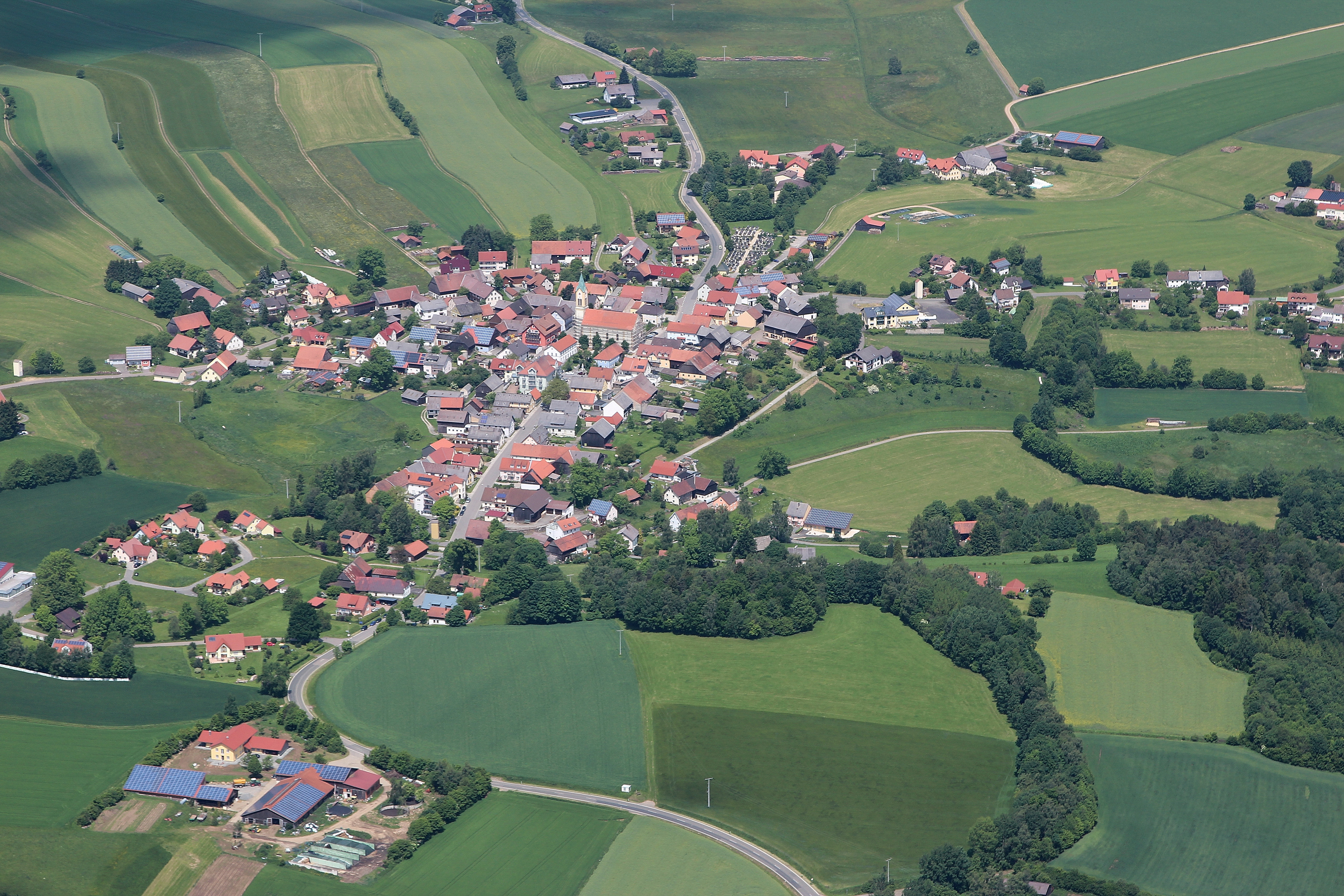
- Aerial view

- Coat of arms

- Location of Weiding within Schwandorf district
- Interactive map of Weiding
- Location within Germany Location within Bavaria
- Coordinates: 49°29′N 12°34′E
- Country: Germany
- State: Bavaria
- Admin. region: Oberpfalz
- District: Schwandorf
- Municipal assoc.: Schönsee

Government
  - Mayor (2020–26): Manfred Dirscherl

Area
  - Total: 22.43 km^{2} (8.66 sq mi)
- Elevation: 671 m (2,201 ft)

Population (2025-12-31)
  - Total: 450
  - Density: 20/km^{2} (52/sq mi)
- Time zone: UTC+01:00 (CET)
  - Summer (DST): UTC+02:00 (CEST)
- Postal codes: 92557
- Dialling codes: 0 96 74
- Vehicle registration: SAD
- Website: www.schoenseer-land.de

Weiding (German pronunciation: [ˈvaɪdɪŋ]) is a municipality in the district of Schwandorf in Bavaria, Germany.

== History ==
In the 10th and 11th centuries, Bavarian settlers wandered from Nabburg to the east. Weiding was founded before 1270 and is one of the oldest villages of the region. It frequently changed ownership and in 1803, it was finally sold to the Earl of Du Moulin-Eckart to whom it still belongs today.

== Geography ==
Weiding is located on a plateau with the mountain Frauenstein to the southwest and the Hüttenbach-valley to the east, with the hamlets Reimermühle, Sägmühle, Andreasthal and Löwenthal.

== Villages and hamlets ==
- Andreasthal
- Frauenthal
- Löwenthal
- Preißhof
- Reimermühle
- Sägmühle
- Weiding
- Wirtsmühle

== Religion ==
In 1280 a stone church of St. Nikolaus is mentioned in an urbarium. It was destroyed by the Hussites in the 15th century. The rebuilt church burned down in 1836. The current church was built in 1842 and like the others dedicated to St. Nikolaus. To the parish of Weiding belong also the church St. Laurentius of Schönau and the church St. Michael of Hannesried. 95% of the inhabitants of Weiding are Catholics.

Priests in Weiding since 1900:

- 1900 to 1905 Josef Prasch
- 1905 to 1920 Josef Köppelle
- 1920 to 1930 Georg Kiener
- 1930 to 1935 Sturm
- 1935 to 1954 Paulinus Fröhlich
- 1954 to 1959 Josef Bock
- 1959 to 1974 Franz Xaver Hebauer
- 1974 to 1991 Michael Reitinger
- 1991 to 2017 Jan Adrian Łata

== Bibliography ==
- Teresa Guggenmoos: Stadt Schönsee. Verlag der Stadt Schönsee, Schönsee 1981
- Heribert Batzl (Hrsg.): Der Landkreis Oberviechtach in Vergangenheit und Gegenwart. Verlag für Behörden und Wirtschaft R. Alfred Hoeppner, Aßling/Obb. und München 1970
- Franz Liebl, Heimatkreis Bischofteinitz (Hrsg.): Unser Heimatkreis Bischofteinitz. Brönner & Daentler KG, Eichstätt 1967
- Paulinus Fröhlich: Weiding bei Schönsee Beiträge zur Geschichte des Ortes. Weiding 1956
- Emma Baier: Kirchen, Kapellen, Marterl und Feldkreuze in und um Weiding, Landkreis Schwandorf. Direktion für ländliche Entwicklung, Regensburg 2003
- Richard Bierl, Gemeinde Tiefenbach/Bayern (Hrsg.): Chronik der Gemeinde Tiefenbach/Bayern. Carl Mayr, Buch- und Offsetdruckerei, Amberg 1980
