= 32nd SS Volunteer Grenadier Division =

German infantry division

32nd SS Volunteer Grenadier Division "30th January"
- 32. SS-Freiwilligen Grenadier-Division "30. Januar"
- Divisional insignia (Tyr rune)
- Active: January – May 1945
- Country: Germany
- Branch: (Schutzstaffel) Waffen-SS
- Type: Infantry
- Size: Division
- Part of: 9th Army; V SS Mountain Corps
- Engagements: World War II; Eastern Front; Battle of Berlin

The 32nd SS Volunteer Grenadier Division "30th January" (German: 32. SS-Freiwilligen Grenadier-Division „30. Januar“) was formed in January 1945 at the SS Training Area Kurmark, Jamlitz, from what remained of the staff and trainees of SS schools and various other troops. The Kurmark Recruit Depot became the division's 87th Volunteer Grenadier Regiment. The nucleus of the division was Kampfgruppe Schill (Combat Group Schill), which had fought against the Slovak National Uprising in 1944, and it became the 86th Regiment. The division's other units were formed from the SS Artillery Training and Replacement Regiment in Prague and the Pioneer School. A significant cadre came from Hungarian and Romanian fascists who had joined the SS, but their numbers are unknown.

The division fought as part of the V SS Mountain Corps, on the Oder front, just north of Fürstenberg (now part of Eisenhüttenstadt) and in the Battle of Berlin. The division was destroyed in the Halbe pocket, but parts of the unit surrendered to the Americans at Tangermünde.

The division's name referred to 30 January 1933, the date that Adolf Hitler was sworn in as Chancellor of Germany.

The division's insignia was a Tyr rune, denoting a spear.

== Commanders ==
- Johannes Mühlenkamp (30 January 1945 – 5 February 1945)
- Joachim Richter (5 February 1945 – 17 February 1945)
- Adolf Ax (17 February 1945 – 15 March 1945)
- Hans Kempin (15 March 1945 – 8 May 1945)

== Order of battle ==
- SS Volunteer Grenadier Regiment 86 Schill
- SS Volunteer Grenadier Regiment 87 Kurmark
- SS Volunteer Artillery Regiment 32
- SS Panzerjäger Battalion 32
- SS Füsilier Battalion 32
- SS Flak Battalion 32
- SS Pioneer Battalion 32
- SS Signals Battalion 32
- SS Supply Regiment 32

== See also ==
- List of German divisions in World War II
- List of Waffen-SS divisions
- List of SS personnel
