= Hostouň (Domažlice District) =

- Town
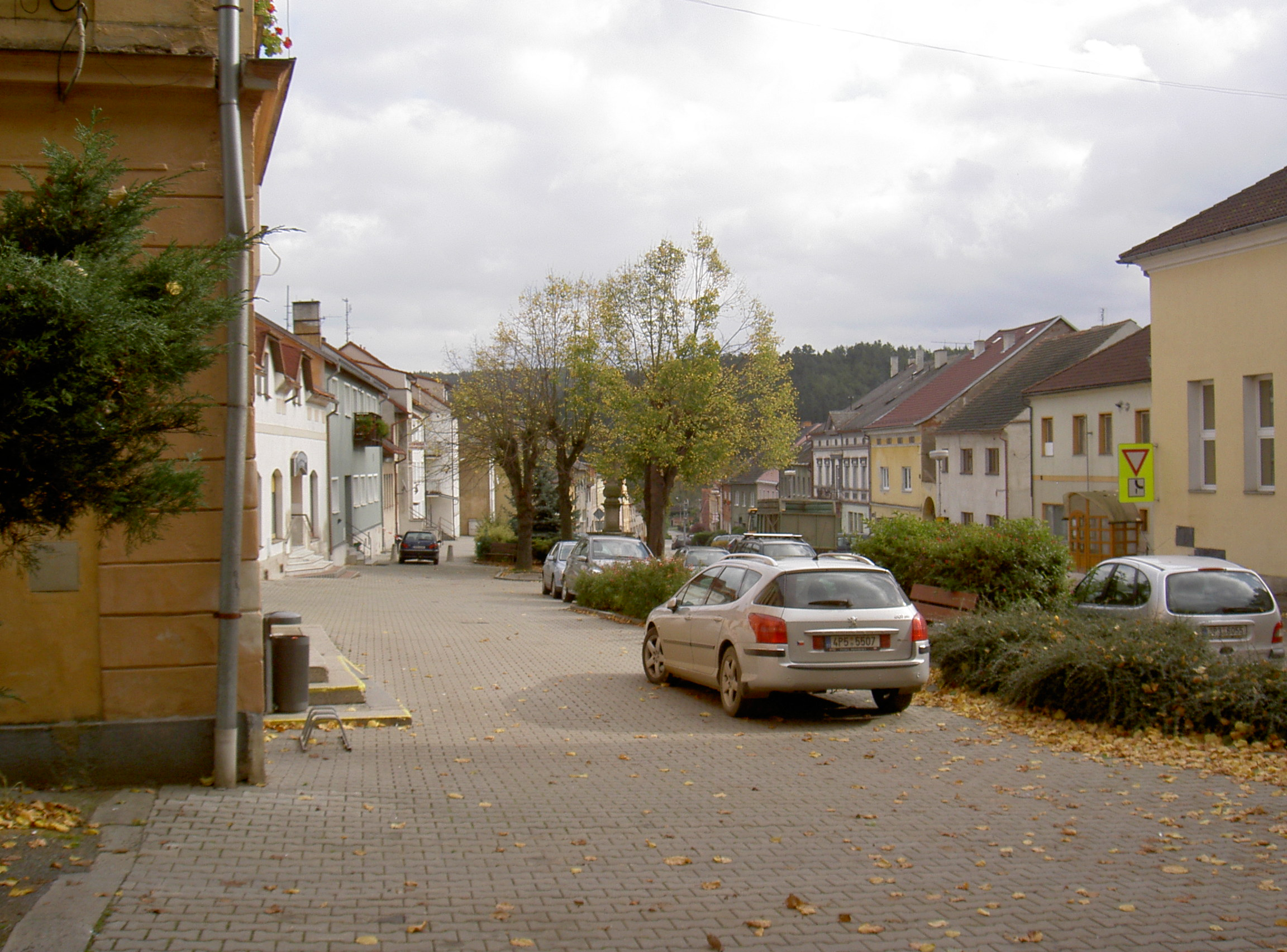
- The square Chodské náměstí

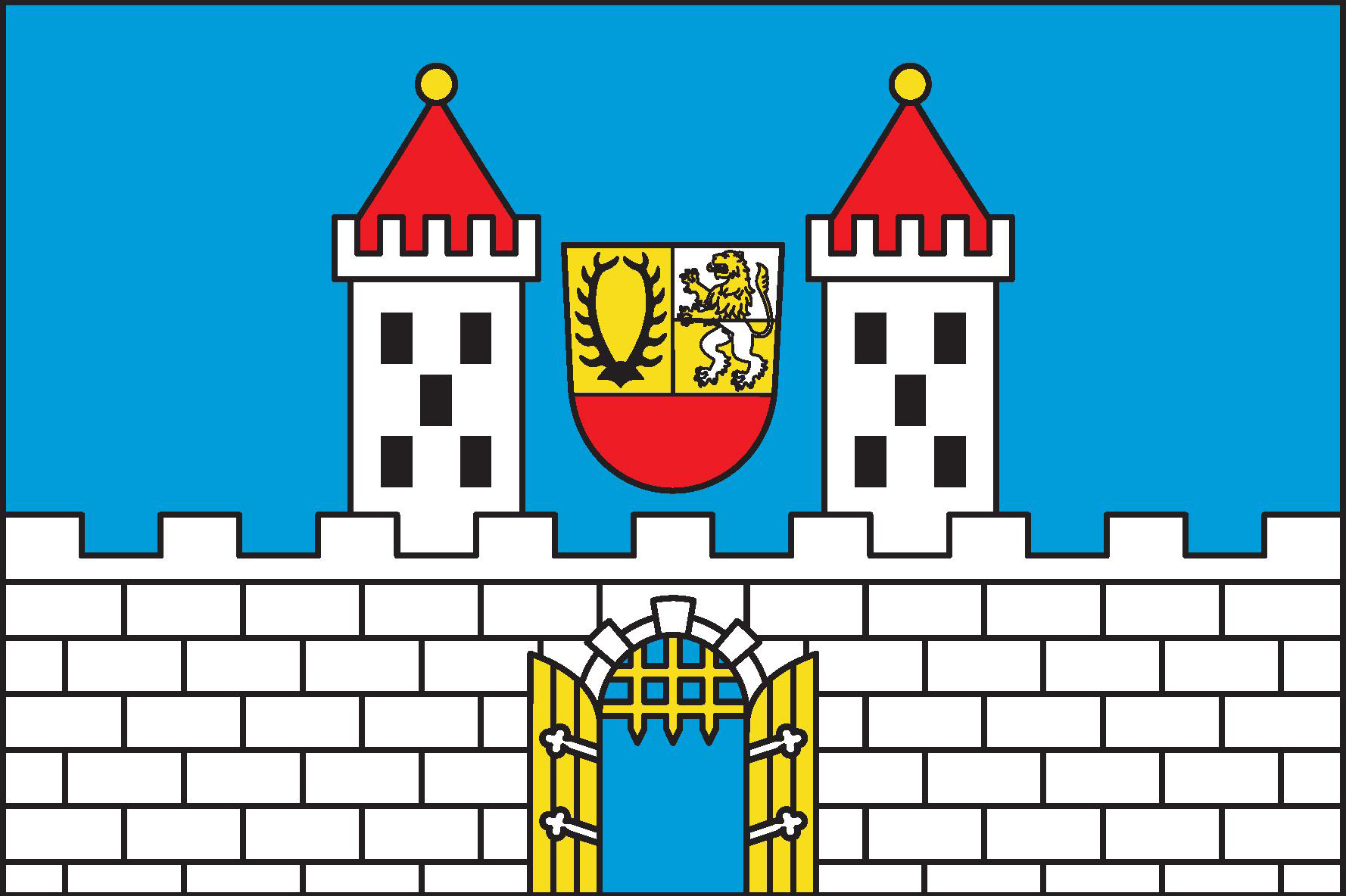
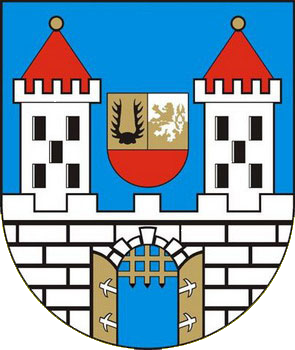
- Flag Coat of arms

- Location in the Czech Republic
- Coordinates: 49°33′38″N 12°46′15″E
- Country: Czech Republic
- Region: Plzeň
- District: Domažlice
- First mentioned: 1247

Government
  - Mayor: Miroslav Rauch

Area
  - Total: 38.51 km^{2} (14.87 sq mi)
- Elevation: 432 m (1,417 ft)

Population (2026-01-01)
  - Total: 1,224
  - Density: 31.78/km^{2} (82.32/sq mi)
- Time zone: UTC+1 (CET)
  - Summer (DST): UTC+2 (CEST)
- Postal code: 345 25
- Website: www.hostoun.cz

Hostouň (Czech pronunciation: [ˈɦostouɲ]; German: Hostau) is a town in Domažlice District in the Plzeň Region of the Czech Republic. It has about 1,200 inhabitants. The town is located on the Radbuza River in the Podčeskoleská Hills.

== Administrative division ==
Hostouň consists of 12 municipal parts (in brackets population according to the 2021 census):

- Hostouň (918)
- Babice (15)
- Holubeč (83)
- Horoušany (12)
- Mělnice (38)
- Mírkovice (10)
- Přes (25)
- Skařez (10)
- Slatina (5)
- Štítary (41)
- Svržno (40)
- Sychrov (12)

== Etymology ==
The name is derived from the personal name Hostoun, meaning "Hostoun's (court)".

== Geography ==
Hostouň is located about 17 kilometres (11 mi) northwest of Domažlice and 46 km (29 mi) southwest of Plzeň. It lies in the Podčeskoleská Hills. The highest point is the hill Sedlo at 615 m (2,018 ft) above sea level. The upper course of the Radbuza River flows through the town.

== History ==
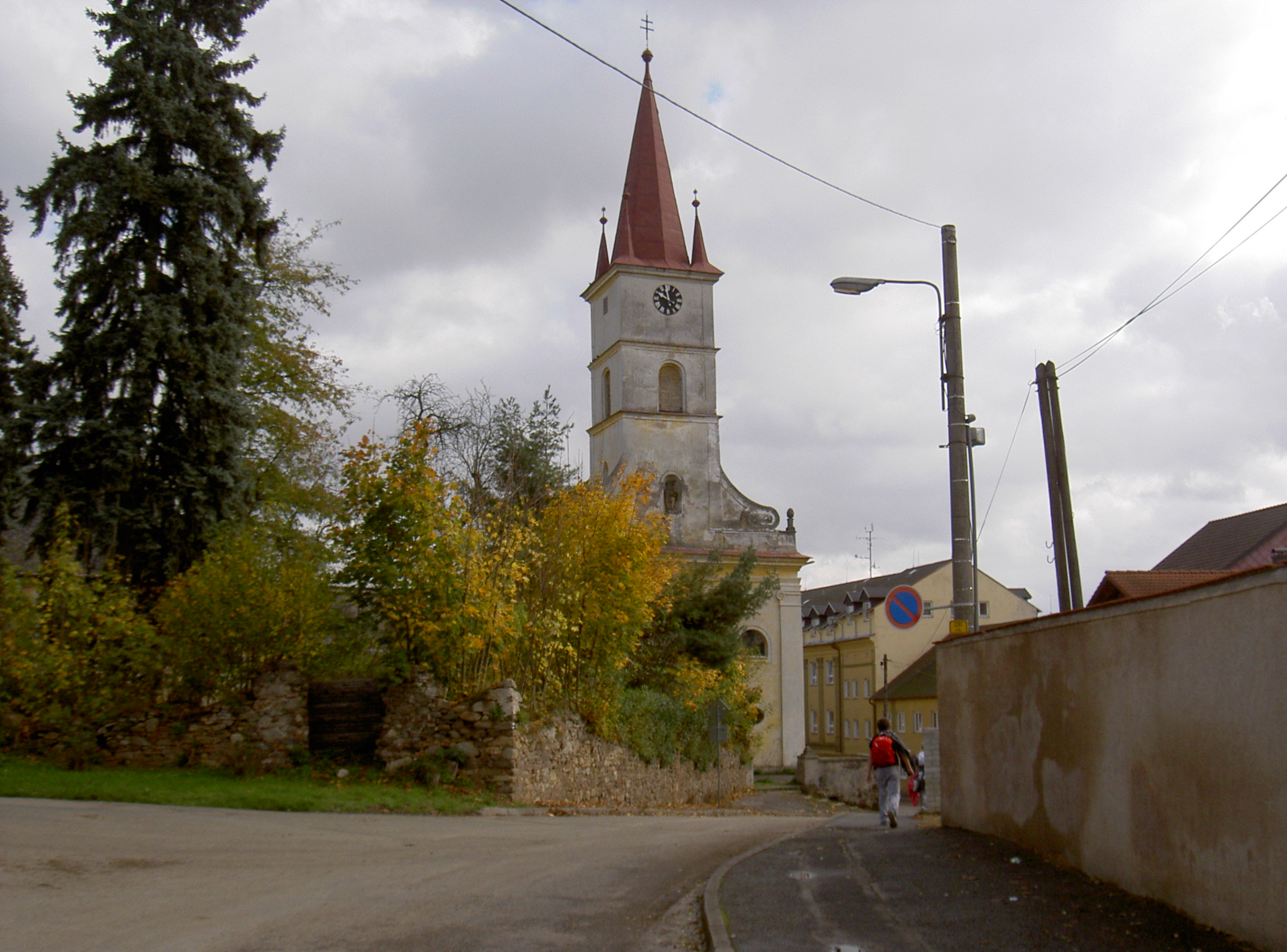
Church of Saint James the Great

The first written mention of Hostouň is from 1238, when it was a property of Gumpert of Hostouň. His descendants who ruled the area until the 15th century also possessed the Palatinate town of Schönsee.

During the Hussite Wars, Ctibor of Wolfstein, a supporter of Emperor Sigismund, ruled Hostouň. When the reign of the noble families of Wolfstein and Rabenstein came to an end, the Hostouň estate was taken over by the Lords of Guttenstein. In 1587, Emperor Rudolf II promoted Hostouň to a town and awarded it with coat of arms. Additionally in 1587, the town was granted a concession to hold two other fairs and a horse market in addition to the annual market.

At the end of the 16th century, the Czech population predominated, but ethnic Germans began to arrive. As a consequence of the Battle of White Mountain, the property of the Guttensteins was confiscated. The estate was sold to Zdeněk of Mitrovice (1622), after a short period sold to the Czernin family and in 1656 to the Counts of Trauttmansdorff-Weinsberg, who merged their estates of Horšovský Týn and Hostouň.

In 1914, an imperial military horse breeding operation of Galicia and Bukowina was transferred to Hostouň. During World War II, parts of the famous Lipizzaner horses of the Spanish Riding School in Vienna were located in Hostouň. In 1952, the stud farm was abolished.

From 1938 to 1945, Hostouň was annexed by Nazi Germany and administered as part of the Reichsgau Sudetenland. In 1946, the Germans were the major ethnic group in Hostouň. After World War II, the German-speaking population was expelled and many buildings were demolished. Additionally, Hostouň lost the title of a town, which was restored in 2006.

== Demographics ==
Historical population

Year	Pop.	±%
1869	3,119	—
1880	3,130	+0.4%
1890	2,956	−5.6%
1900	2,963	+0.2%
1910	2,967	+0.1%

Year	Pop.	±%
1921	2,840	−4.3%
1930	2,697	−5.0%
1950	1,401	−48.1%
1961	1,207	−13.8%
1970	1,134	−6.0%

Year	Pop.	±%
1980	1,014	−10.6%
1991	1,102	+8.7%
2001	1,246	+13.1%
2011	1,365	+9.6%
2021	1,209	−11.4%

Source: Censuses

== Transport ==
Hostouň is located on the railway line of local importance from Domažlice to Bělá nad Radbuzou.

== Sights ==
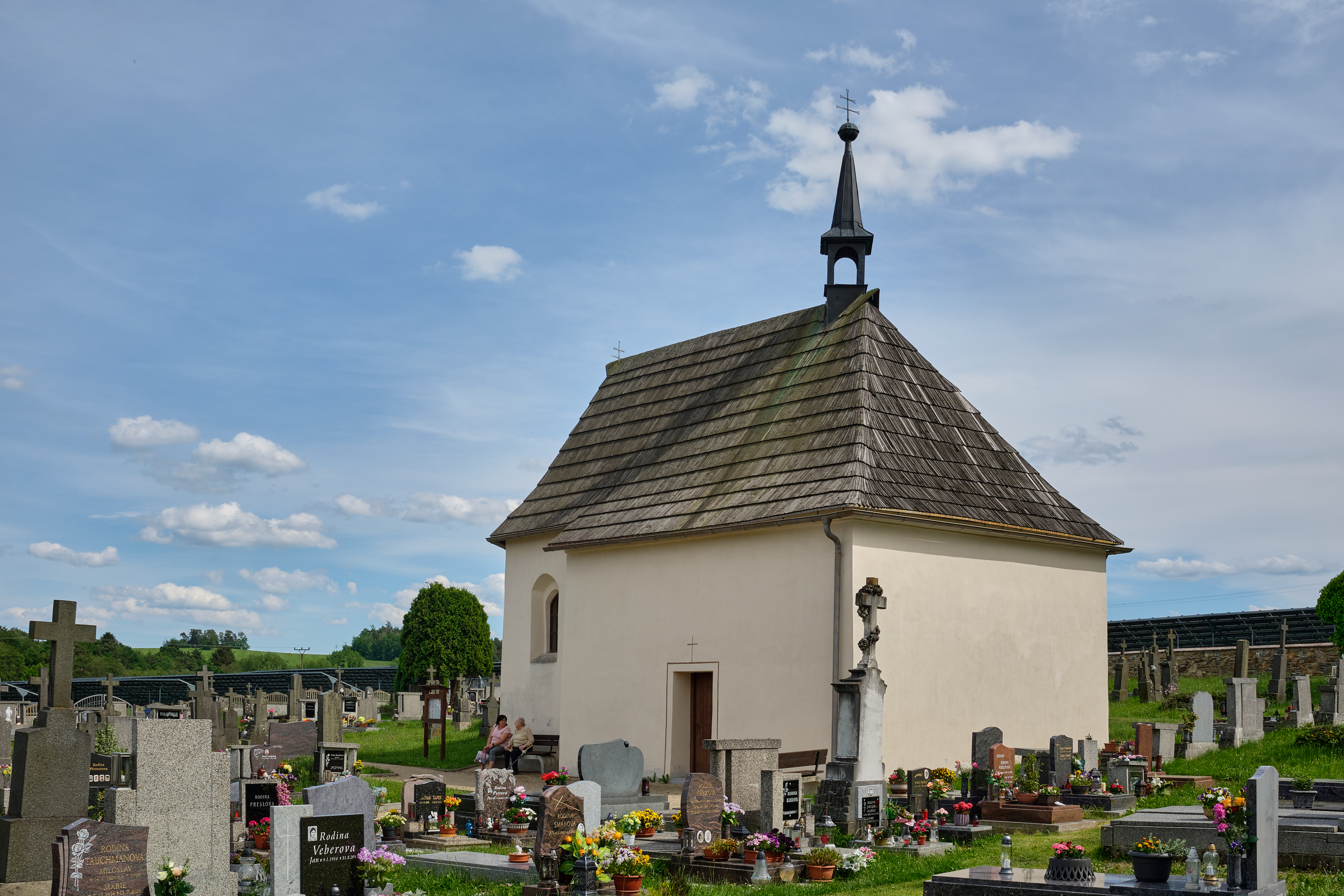
Chapel of the Assumption of the Virgin Mary

The main landmark of Hostouň is the Church of Saint James the Great. It was first mentioned in written records in 1360. The church was rebuilt in the Baroque style in 1731 and reconstructed after the great fire in 1877. It includes a copy of a wood carved Madonna, which was adored as the "Shrine of the Sorrowful Mother of God of Hostouň". The Baroque rectory next to the church dates from the 18th century.

The Chapel of the Assumption of the Virgin Mary was built in 1663 as a chapel for the cemetery by a donation from Susanna Kleinschmidt.

The Hostouň Castle was originally a fortress, first mentioned in 1508. In the first half of the 17th century, it was already described as an aristocratic residence. The originally four-winged castle was reduced to today's two wings due to construction modifications. Insensitive building modifications in the 20th century erased the historical character. Since 2002, the castle has been used as a juvenile jail.

== Twin towns – sister cities ==
Hostouň is twinned with:

- Waldthurn, Germany
