= SS-Junker Schools =

Nazi SS leadership training facilities

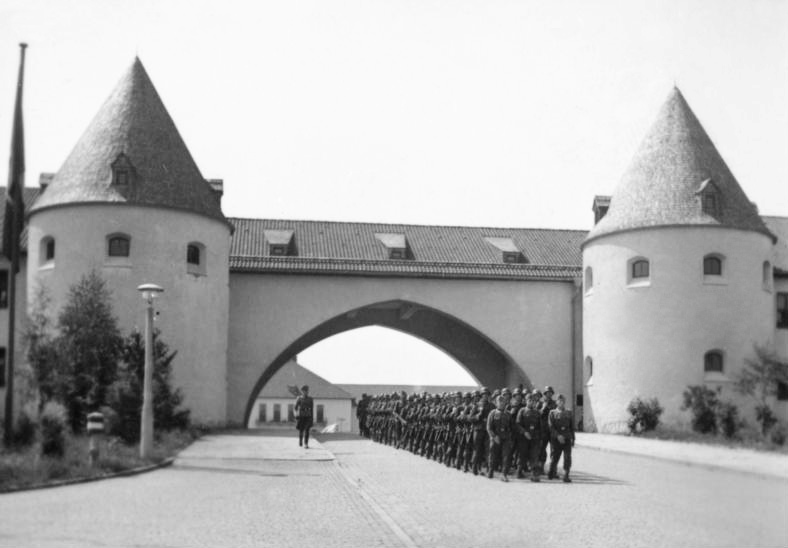
SS-Junker School at Bad Tölz, 1942

SS-Junker Schools (German: SS-Junkerschulen) were leadership training facilities for officer candidates of the Schutzstaffel (SS). The term Junkerschulen was introduced by Nazi Germany in 1937, although the first facilities were established at Bad Tölz and Braunschweig in 1934 and 1935. Additional schools were founded at Klagenfurt and Posen-Treskau in 1943, and Prague in 1944. Unlike the Wehrmacht's "war schools", admission to the SS-Junker Schools did not require a secondary diploma. Training at these schools provided the groundwork for employment with the Sicherheitspolizei (SiPo; security police), the Sicherheitsdienst (SD; security service), and later for the Waffen-SS. Heinrich Himmler, head of the SS, intended for these schools to mold cadets for future service in the officer ranks of the SS.

== History ==
As part of an effort to professionalize their officers, the SS founded a leadership school in 1934; the first one was at the Bavarian town of Bad Tölz, established under the leadership of SS-Colonel Paul Lettow. Originally known as Führerschulen (Leadership Schools), the institutions were officially renamed Junkerschulen in August 1937 to reflect their distinct role in cultivating SS officer elites modeled after Prussian Junker traditions. (Note: The Tölz school played a key role in racial and ideological education, particularly after 1942 when it became a hub for the "Germanic officer training" of foreign SS volunteers. Candidates also underwent racial screening by RuSHA examiners before admission.) Thereafter, a second school at Braunschweig under the direction of then SS-Oberführer Paul Hausser was founded. Hausser's military experience and detailed knowledge as a retired army lieutenant general was leveraged by Himmler in developing the curriculum at both the Bad Tölz and Braunschweig training centers. To his staff, Hausser added other experienced military veterans and gifted officers to build a training regimen that became the foundation for the Waffen-SS.

In 1937, Himmler rechristened the Leadership Schools to "Junker Schools" in honor of the land-owning Junker aristocracy that once dominated the Prussian military. Akin to the Junker officers of their namesake, most cadets eventually led Waffen-SS regiments into combat. Before World War II concluded, additional SS Leadership Schools at Klagenfurt, Posen-Treskau, and Prague/Dejvice (de:SS-Junkerschule Prag-Dewitz) had been founded.

Himmler intended to use the SS-Junker Schools to help instill the SS ethic into Nazi Germany's police forces. To accomplish this, a percentage of SS-Junker School graduates entered the ranks of the Uniformed Police; in 1937, some 40 percent of Junker School-graduates joined the police, and another 32 percent were integrated into the police in 1938. Prior to 1938, the Junkerschulen lacked a unified ideological direction. Himmler and SS training leaders noted that the schools, like other SS institutions, had diverged into autonomous lines of instruction. The restructuring of the Schulungsamt under the SS-Hauptamt in 1938 was partially in response to this fragmentation. In a corresponding directive issued in 1938, the Junkerschulen were formally tasked with developing ideologically trained cadres for roles throughout the SS, including the police and intelligence arms, in line with Himmler's conception of the SS as a political and racial elite entrusted with safeguarding the Nazi state. (Note: These schools were closely tied to SS-Mannschaftshäuser, which served as residential outposts for university-educated SS members. In 1938–1939, academic lecture series held at Tölz were coordinated with these institutions to attract students into the SS officer pipeline.)

Suitable members of the Hitler Youth were identified, as were students who had successfully completed their Abitur (university entrance exam) for application into the SS-Junker Schools or they could elect to attend Nazi Germany's police officer candidate schools. Graduates and affiliates of the SS-Junker Schools were among those persons given the Hitler Sondergerichtsbarkeit (special jurisdiction), which freed them from prosecution for criminal acts. Also included in this extrajudicial group were the likes of the Gestapo, the SiPO, and the SD.

== Training ==
Created to educate and mold the next generation of leadership within the SS, cadets were taught to be adaptable officers who could perform any task assigned to them, whether in a police role, at a Nazi concentration camp, as part of a fighting unit, or within the greater SS organization. Additional administrative and economic training was included at the behest of SS-Gruppenführer Oswald Pohl and the SS Main Economic and Administrative Department. Pohl intended to shape future SS officers into effective and efficient managers of the SS economics industry and insisted that supplemental training in corporate operations was integrated into the curriculum. For his purposes, Pohl was attempting to create a hybrid officer type—what he termed a soldatischer Beamter (soldier-administrator). Junkerschule alumni were encouraged to undergo further training in SS administration to combine ideological, military, and bureaucratic competencies.

The schools were conceived not only as training institutions for the Waffen-SS, but as ideological and administrative leadership incubators for the entire SS apparatus. According to Hans-Christian Harten, only approximately 24 to 32 percent of the graduates prior to the war joined Waffen-SS combat units, while others were placed in the Sicherheitsdienst (SD), concentration camp administration (Totenkopfverbände), and even the Ordnungspolizei.

General military instruction over logistics and planning was provided but much of the training concentrated on small-unit tactics associated with raids, patrols, and ambushes. Training an SS officer took as much as nineteen months overall and encompassed additional things like map reading, tactics, military maneuvers, political education, weapons training, physical education, combat engineering and even automobile mechanics, all of which were provided in varying degrees at additional training facilities based on the cadet's specialization. To this end, the curriculum combined military, academic, and ideological components. Budgets from 1938 reveal significant allocations for cultural education, including 25,000 Reichsmarks for lectures and "instructional excursions," and 10,000 Reichsmarks earmarked for social education, which included events like formal dances and social outings.

Political and ideological indoctrination was part of the syllabus for all SS cadets but there was no merger of academic learning and military instruction like that found at West Point in the United States. Instead, personality training was stressed, which meant future SS leaders/officers were shaped above all things by a National Socialist worldview and attitude. Correspondingly, instruction emphasized not only ideological memorization but rhetorical internalization. Junkers were trained to defend National Socialist principles through discussion and argumentation, fostering what instructors described as "fanatical clarity of thought". Cultural excursions were also used to reinforce ideological identity. For instance, Junkers from the Braunschweig school were taken on organized trips to Leipzig, where they attended performances by the renowned Thomanerchor choir of St. Thomas Church, including Bach motets, as part of their exposure to "German cultural heritage." Instruction at the Junker Schools was designed to communicate a sense of cultural and racial superiority, a connection to other dependable like-minded men, ruthlessness, and a toughness that accorded the value system of the SS.

Throughout their stay during the training, cadets were constantly monitored for their "ideological reliability." (Note: SS pedagogical philosophy incorporated elements of progressive education, favoring interactive, experiential learning over dry didacticism. Himmler, himself the son of a schoolteacher, was critical of paukermäßiger Unterricht (drill-like teaching), and favored instructional approaches that mirrored reform pedagogy and nationalist youth movements.) In 1944, the curriculum was expanded to include a course titled "SS- und Polizeiwesen" (SS and Police Systems), in which representatives from various SS Main Offices—including the RSHA and RuSHA—delivered lectures to familiarize students with broader SS institutional functions. Students were expected to present and defend ideological positions, give impromptu speeches, write argumentative essays, and defend their views in group debates—reflecting the SS pedagogical goal of Selbstständigkeit im Denken (independent thought within ideological bounds). After graduation and field experience, officers would rotate through the Race and Settlement Office, Sicherheitsdienst (SD), and even interpreter and cavalry schools before being fully placed.

While the system was designed to include formal oversight, the actual quality and content of ideological education varied significantly between schools and even instructors. Formal inspections were rare; most Schulungsleiter were left to interpret ideological intent autonomously, often performing according to perceived expectations rather than clear standards. Despite such training challenges, the merger of the police with the SS was at least partly the result of their shared attendance at the SS Junker Schools. By 1945, more than 15,000 cadets from these training institutions were commissioned as officers in the Waffen-SS.

== See also ==
- Ideology of the SS
