= Schönsee =

- Town
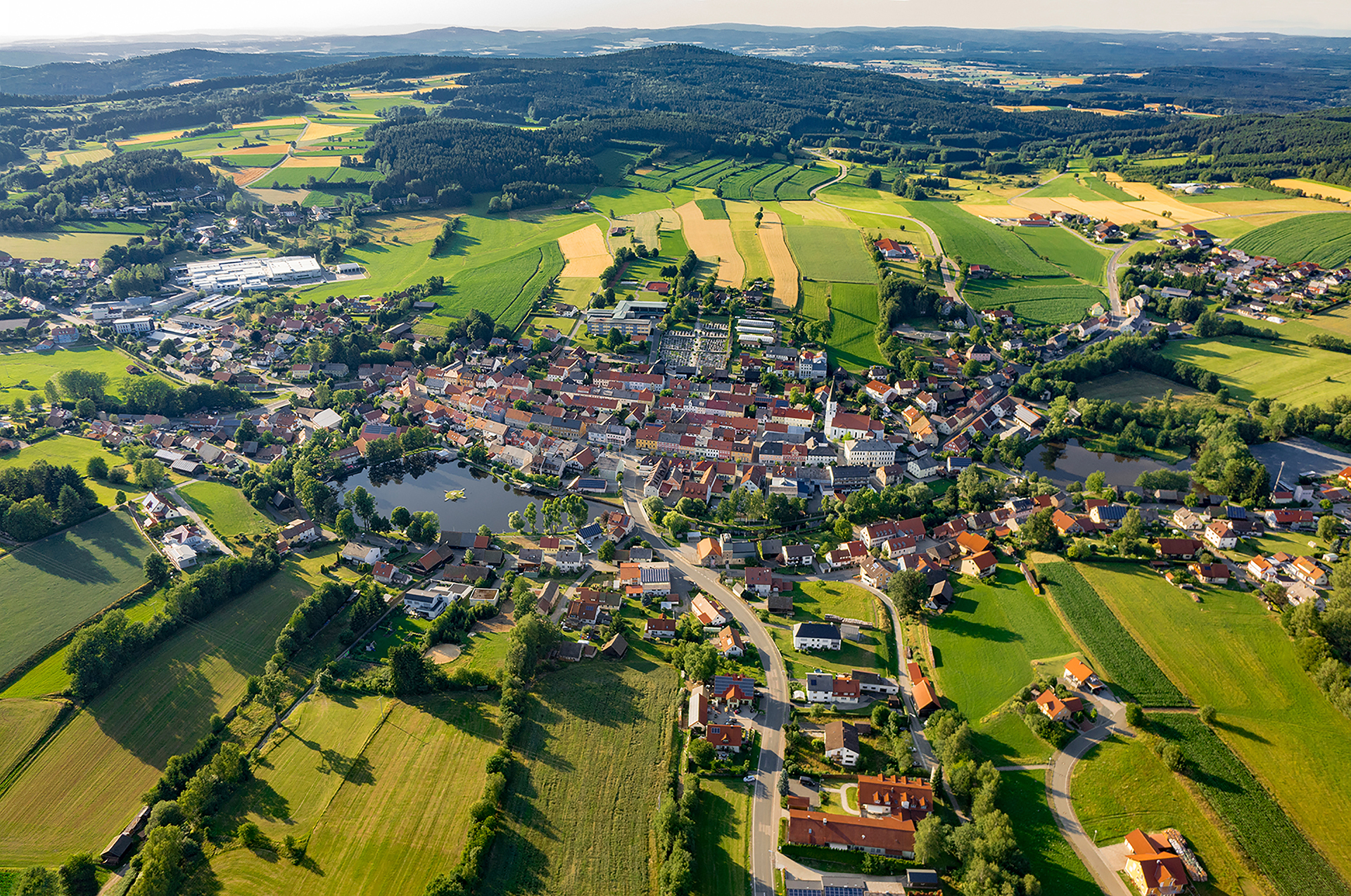
- Aerial view

- Coat of arms

- Location of Schönsee within Schwandorf district
- Interactive map of Schönsee
- Location within Germany Location within Bavaria
- Coordinates: 49°31′N 12°33′E
- Country: Germany
- State: Bavaria
- Admin. region: Oberpfalz
- District: Schwandorf
- Municipal assoc.: Schönsee

Government
  - Mayor (2020–26): Reinhard Kreuzer

Area
  - Total: 50.28 km^{2} (19.41 sq mi)
- Elevation: 655 m (2,149 ft)

Population (2025-12-31)
  - Total: 2,222
  - Density: 44.19/km^{2} (114.5/sq mi)
- Time zone: UTC+01:00 (CET)
  - Summer (DST): UTC+02:00 (CEST)
- Postal codes: 92539
- Dialling codes: 0 96 74
- Vehicle registration: SAD
- Website: www.vg-schoensee.de

Schönsee (German pronunciation: [ˈʃøːnzeː]) is a town in the Schwandorf district of Bavaria, Germany, near the border with the Czech Republic, 38 km northeast of Schwandorf, and 34 km southeast of Weiden in der Oberpfalz.

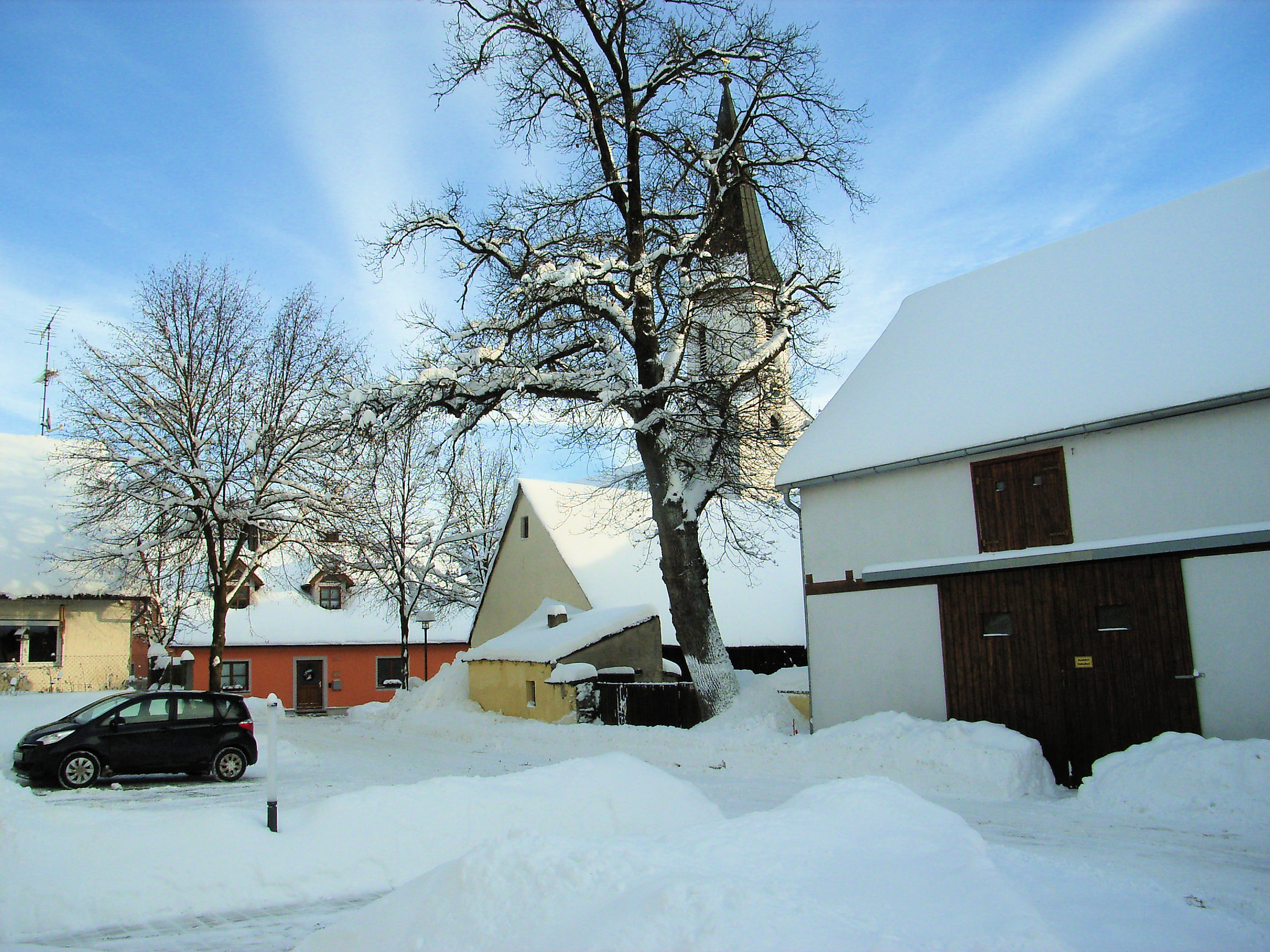
Schönsee winter 2012
