= Schwandorf =

- Town
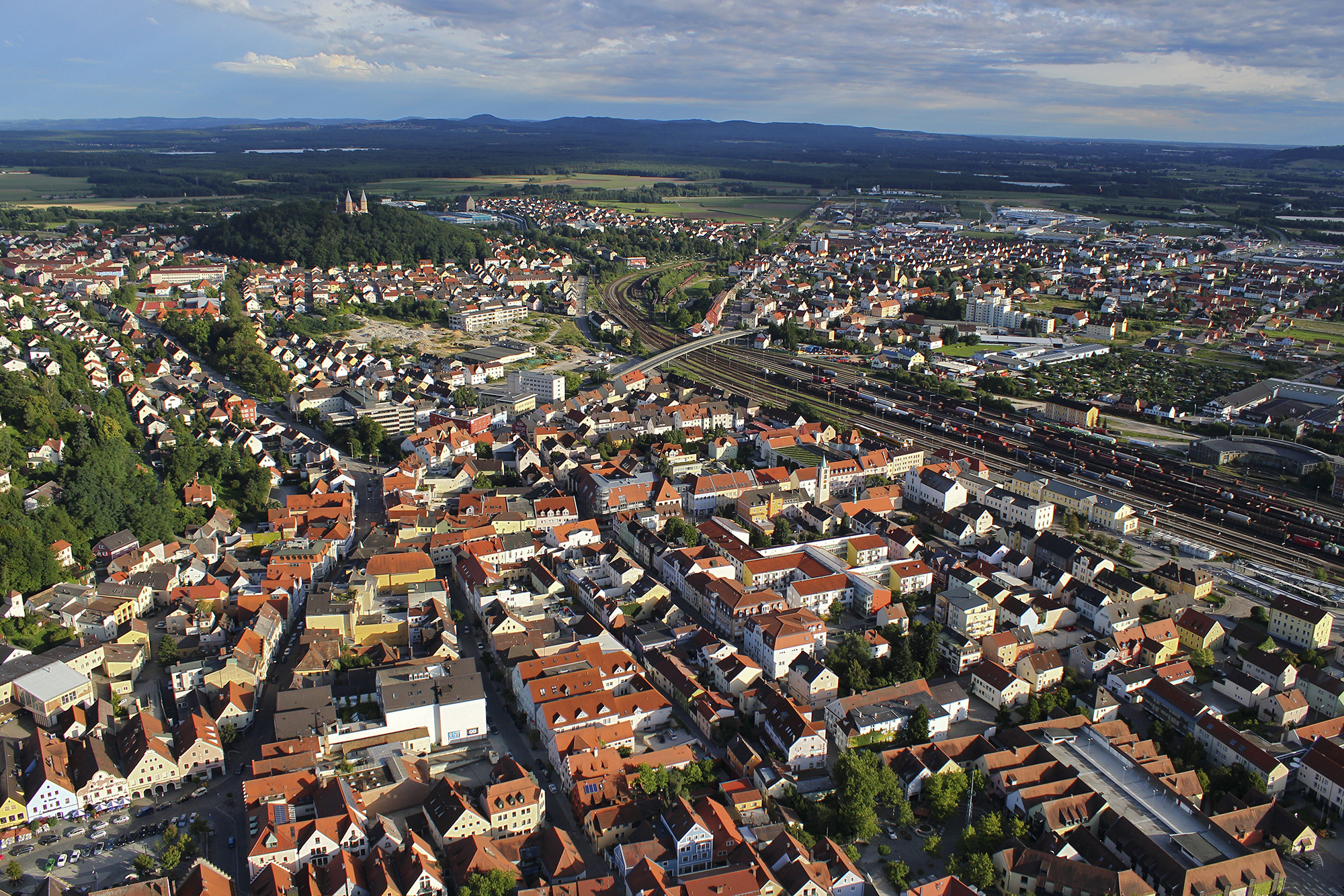
- Aerial view

- Coat of arms

- Location of Schwandorf within Schwandorf district
- Interactive map of Schwandorf
- Location within Germany Location within Bavaria
- Coordinates: 49°19′42″N 12°6′36″E
- Country: Germany
- State: Bavaria
- Admin. region: Oberpfalz
- District: Schwandorf

Government
  - Mayor (2020–26): Andreas Feller (CSU)

Area
  - Total: 123.81 km^{2} (47.80 sq mi)
- Elevation: 366 m (1,201 ft)

Population (2025-12-31)
  - Total: 29,836
  - Density: 240.98/km^{2} (624.14/sq mi)
- Time zone: UTC+01:00 (CET)
  - Summer (DST): UTC+02:00 (CEST)
- Postal codes: 92421
- Dialling codes: 0 94 31
- Vehicle registration: SAD
- Website: www.schwandorf.de

Schwandorf (German pronunciation: [ˈʃvaːndɔʁf]) is a town in the Upper Palatinate in Bavaria, Germany, which is the seat of the Schwandorf district. It lies on the river Naab.

== Geography ==
=== Geographical location ===
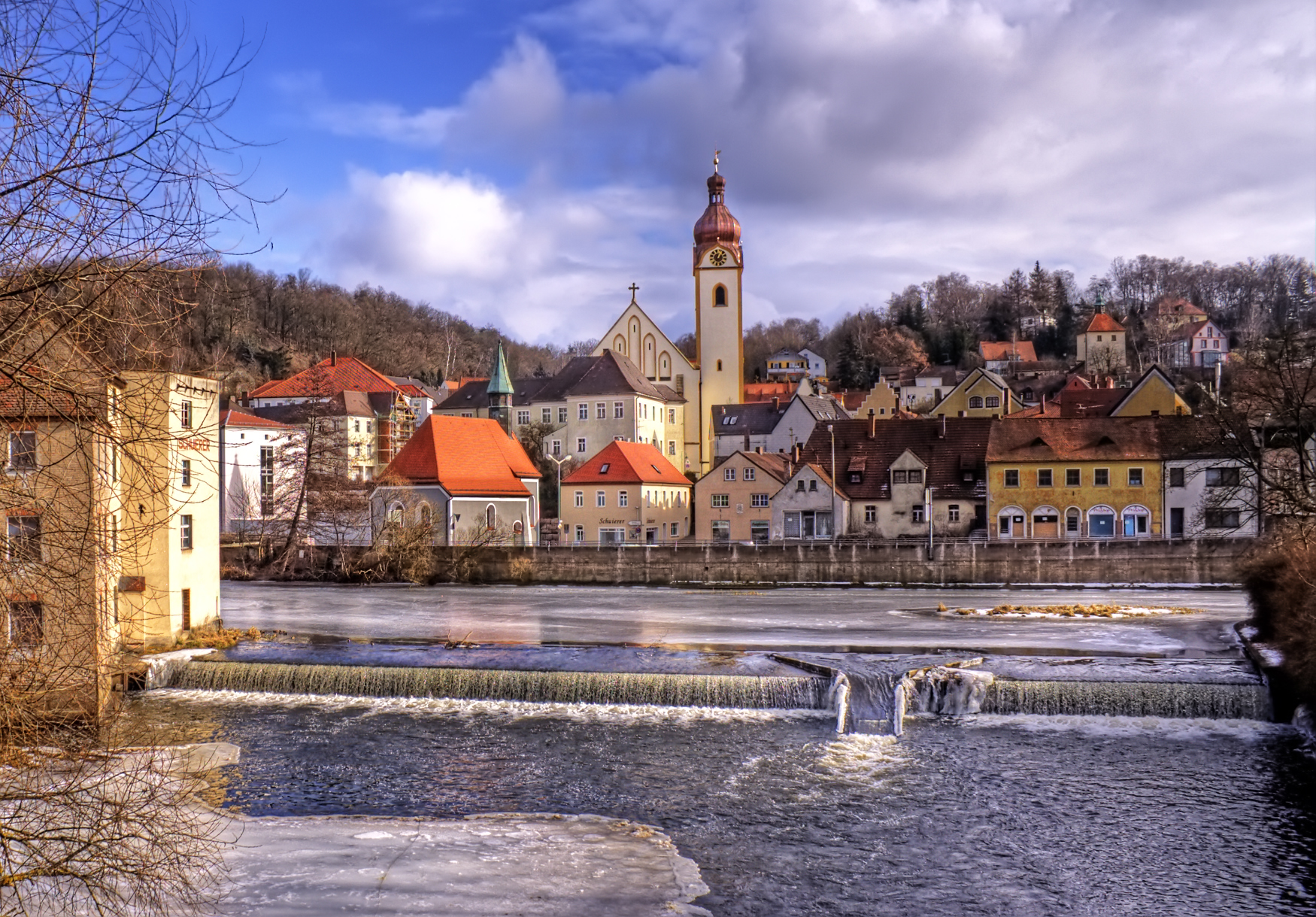
The Naab weir in Schwandorf

Schwandorf is located at the intersection of four depressions in the Schwandorf Bay in the southern Upper Palatinate Forest. The Upper Palatinate Lake District borders the city area. The Naab River runs through the city area from north to south. Nature has created a broad plain in the Naab Valley, the edges of which are formed by iron sandstone hills. The Kreuzberg rises from the plain like a green island. This was once far outside the city gates, but today it is surrounded by the settlement.

The main rivers of the district are the Naab and the Regen

=== Climate ===
The climate in this area has mild differences between highs and lows, and there is adequate rainfall year-round. The Köppen Climate Classification subtype for this climate is "Cfb". (Marine West Coast Climate/Oceanic climate).

== History ==
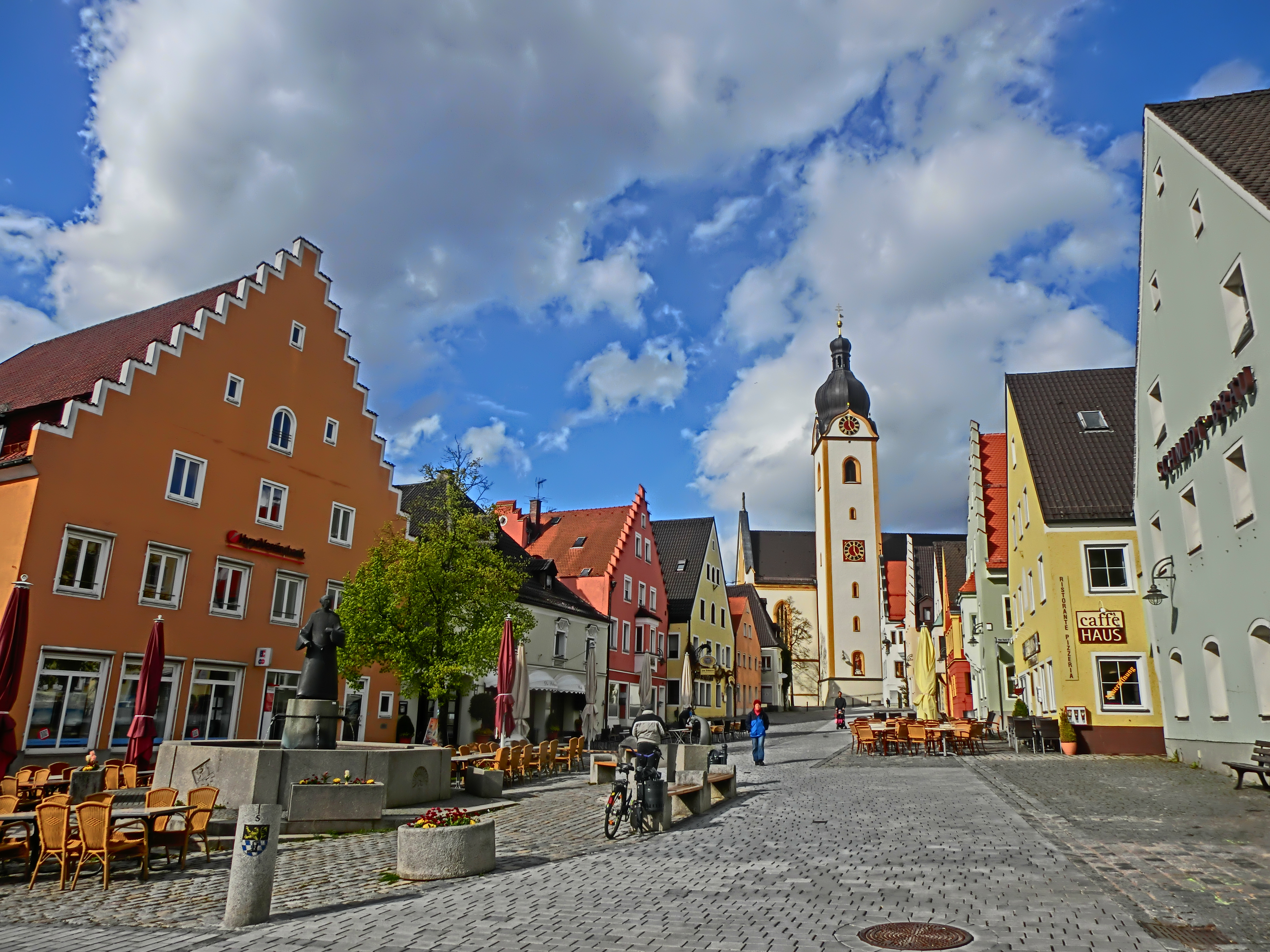
Centre of Schwandorf

Schwandorf was first mentioned in writing in 1006 AD in a document from the monastery of Saint Emmeram as Suainicondorf on the river Naba ( Naab ) in the area of the diocese of Regensburg. Prehistoric finds, for example a fishing hook from the Bronze Age or urn graves from the Urnfield period (1200 to 800 BC) in the city area, as well as research into the origin of the city's name, make it certain that the town was settled very early on. In 1234 AD, Schwandorf in the Upper Palatinate was the seat of a Wittelbach office, in 1286 it was the seat of a dean and, from an ecclesiastical point of view, one of the centers of the diocese of Regensburg in the Nordgau. On 5 January 1299, the market town received a municipal constitution, and from 1446 onwards it was granted full city rights.

During the Landshut War of Succession, Schwandorf was almost completely destroyed in 1504. From 1555 to 1617, Schwandorf was Evangelical Lutheran for three generations as a result of the Peace of Augsburg, which Ottheinrich von Wittelsbach, Count Palatine of Palatinate-Neuburg, had signed up to, and belonged to the Principality of Palatinate-Neuburg until Bavarian unification in 1777. Despite its political peripheral location (border town), Schwandorf remained an economic hub due to its location on an old trade and military route to Bohemia. Most of the town's buildings that are still standing today were built in the 16th century. The town's economic power increased after the Nuremberg–Schwandorf–Regensburg railway line was opened on December 12, 1859. Since 1863, with the opening of the railway line to Weiden in der Oberpfalz, Schwandorf became an important railway junction.

In 1907, 6,985 citizens lived in Schwandorf. Of these, 6,618 were Catholic, 333 Protestant, 19 Israelite, 1 Mennonite and 14 of unknown faith.

In 1933, 29 people of Jewish origin lived in Schwandorf. Louis Waldmann committed suicide in the Charlottenhof district in 1939, and nine other Schwandorf residents were deported and murdered. There are 17 stumbling blocks for them in Schwandorf.

At the end of the Second World War, on April 5, 1945, the train station was attacked for the second time by low-flying aircraft. On April 10, 1945, at 1:45 p.m., eight US low-flying planes fired on a train in Schwandorf. On April 17, 1945, between 3:52 a.m. and 4:07 a.m., Canadian and British Royal Air Force bombers with 167 Lancasters and eight Mosquitos bombed the train station in Schwandorf. The bombardment with 633.3 tons of bombs also devastated the city center as far as the Kreuzberg district. A total of 1,250 people, including refugees and displaced persons and 495 Schwandorf residents, died in this air raid. A total of 514 houses were damaged and 674 completely destroyed. Before the attack, Schwandorf had 1,361 buildings. The station district was particularly hard hit; countless passengers died on the trains that were hit. Because the railway line was largely destroyed, a train transport with around 1,000 prisoners from the Flossenbürg concentration camp stopped near Schwandorf on April 19. When an airplane appeared, panic ensued and some prisoners tried to escape. A total of 41 prisoners were killed, 111 managed to escape. Two groups of 417 and 389 prisoners had to march on south. A few days later, on April 23, 1945, the first US units reached the town of Schwandorf. The town was then occupied by American troops of the 3rd Army as they advanced to a demarcation line in western and southern Bohemia agreed upon in the Potsdam Agreement. It came under the control of the American military government and reconstruction began. The reconstruction of Schwandorf continued for many years after this air raid.

The town of Schwandorf was a district-free town from 1920 to 1972. In the course of an administrative reform, it was incorporated into the newly founded large district on July 1, 1972, became the seat of the district administration and was given the designation of large district town.

On December 28, 1972, the name of the town of Schwandorf in Bavaria was officially changed to Schwandorf.

=== Founding ===
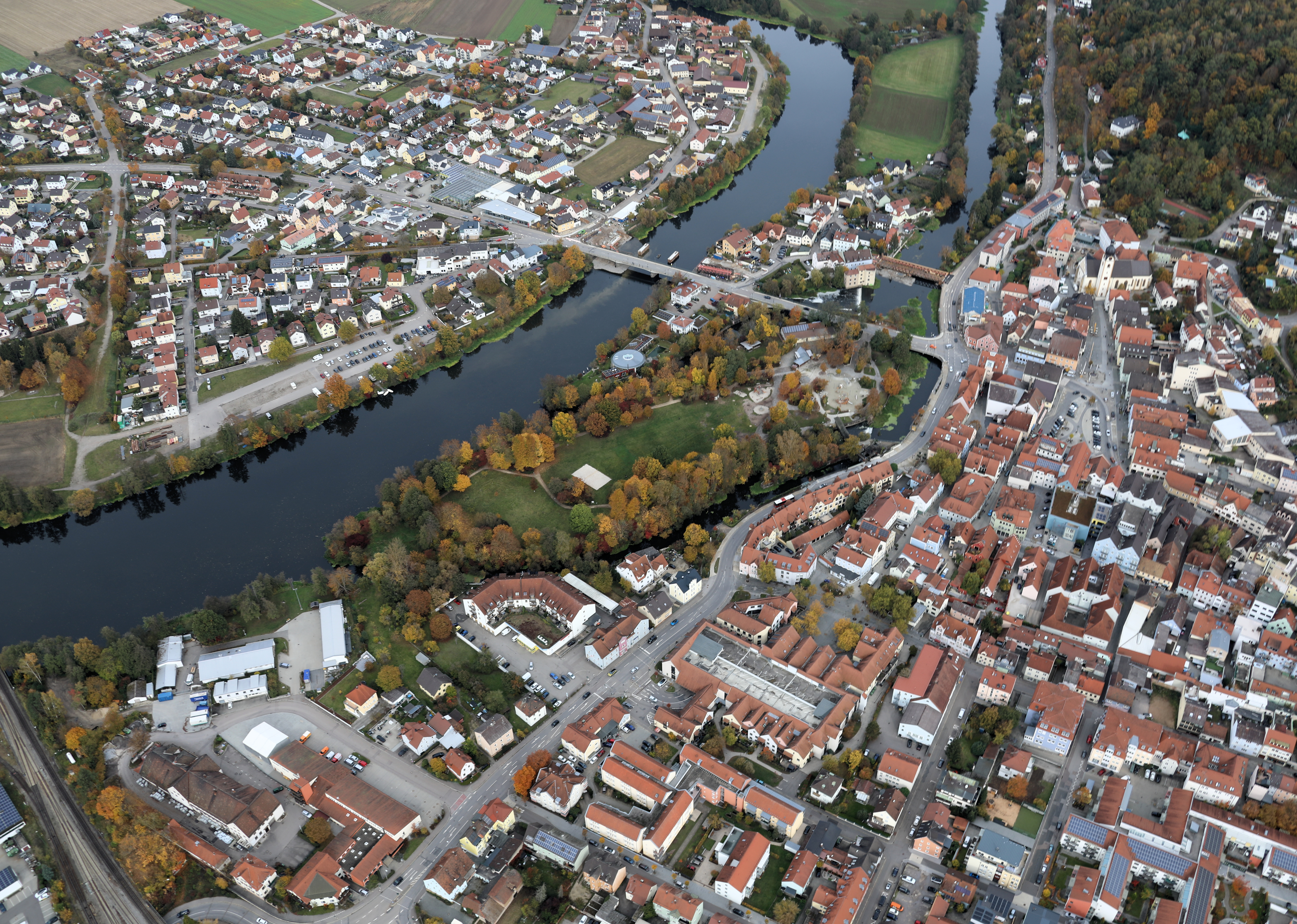
Schwandorf Naab

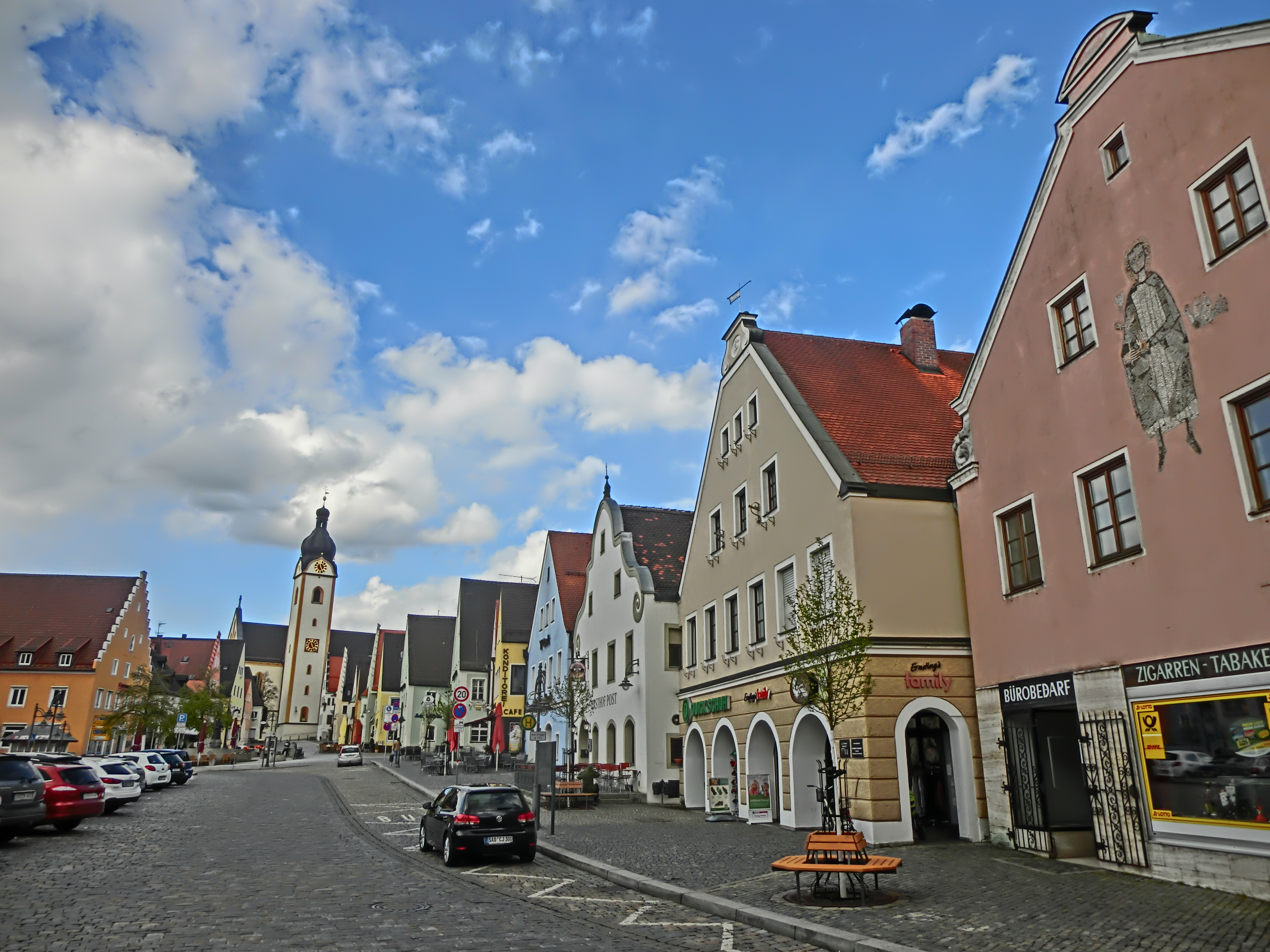
Schwandorf marketplace

The Naab was probably the reason for the founding of the town. Here in the shallow Schwandorf Bay, the river divides into three branches and is so shallow that it is easy to ford through the water. Even in Roman times, the Naab was an important trade route from south to north. The intersection of the road and the river was ideal for a settlement. A landing stage was documented as early as 1158. Salt and iron were among the most important trade goods. With the help of salt, the fish of the Naab became a commodity. Numerous natural and artificial ponds were also managed. The abundance of fish and its management led to the introduction of a fish master's office in the Nordgau, the first evidence of which dates back to the 13th century.

Carp, bream, tench, zander, eels, catfish, barbel, nase, perch and pike can still be caught today. Crayfish were once so numerous that they could be caught by hand and taken to market in wheelbarrows.

Mills powered by the water power of the Naab were another source of livelihood.

Today, hydropower is only used to generate electricity in the city. Freight shipping has also long since stopped. Canoes and kayaks have taken their place. Pond farming is still an economic factor, while river fishing is carried out by sports and fishing clubs.

In the urban area, the following streams feed the Naab: Fensterbach, Els, Rotha, Haselbach with Irlbach, Göggelbach, Blauer Entengraben and Martelgraben.

== Castles ==
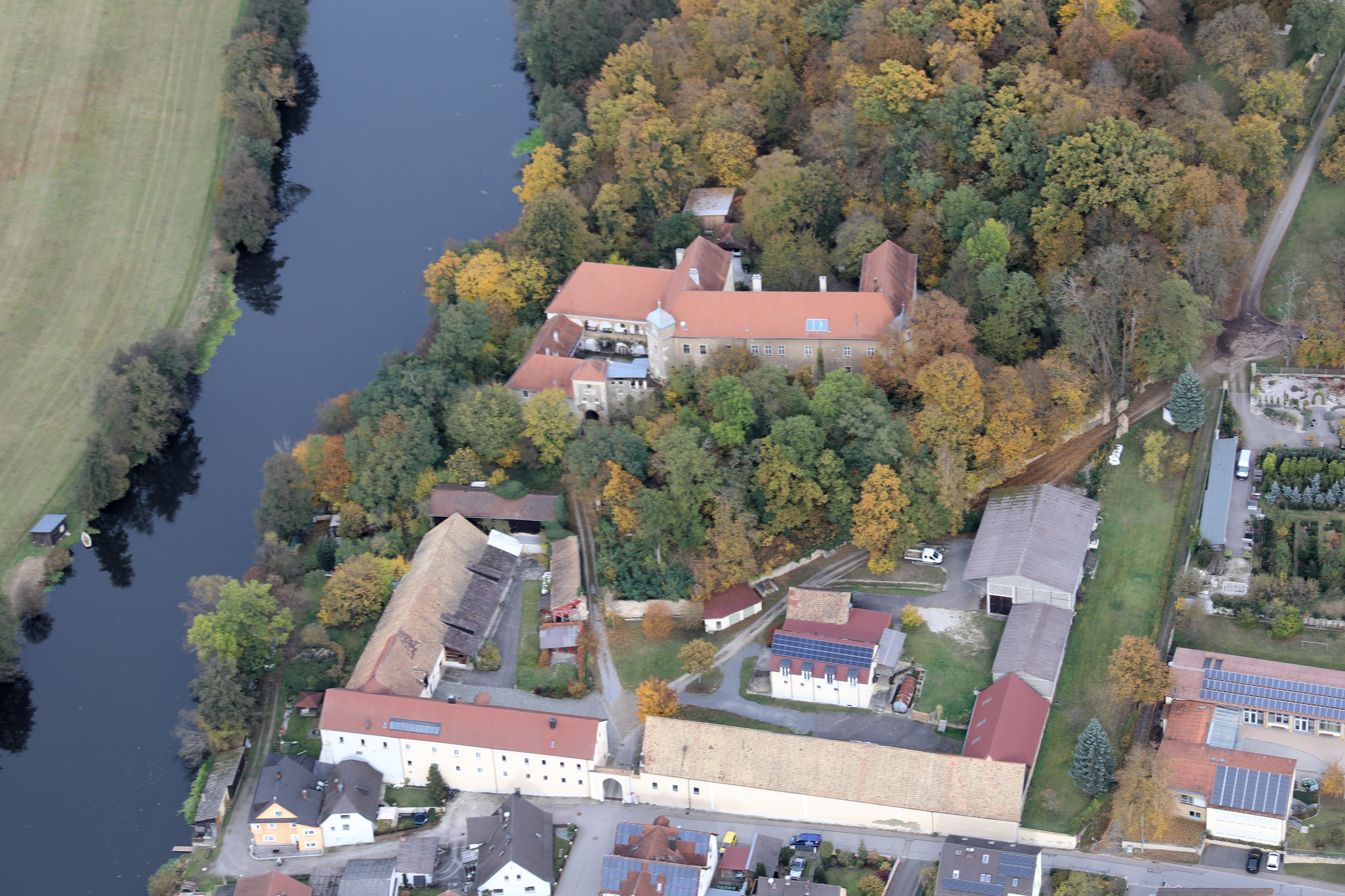
Schloss Fronberg (Schwandorf)

- Schloss Fronberg (Schwandorf)

Castles and palaces in the vicinity of Schwandorf:

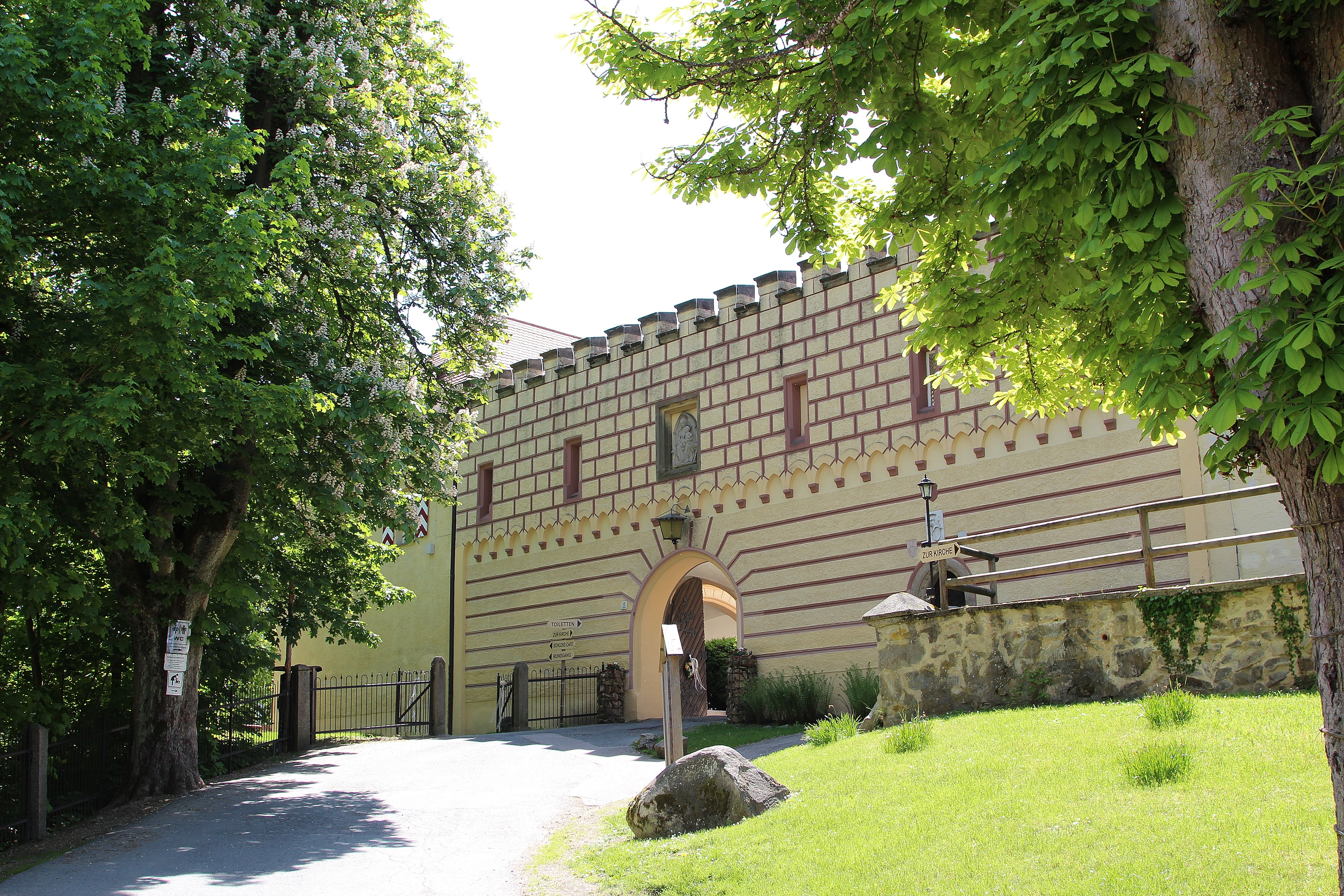
Schloß Guteneck

- Schloß Guteneck
- Schloss Pirkensee
- Burgruine Kallmünz
- Schloss Schönberg
- Schloß Fischbach
- Schloss Hirschling
- Neues Schloss, Neunburg vorm Wald
- Schloß Neusath

== Institutions and administration offices ==
Schwandorf has these associations and significant institutions, offices

- Rathaus Schwandorf

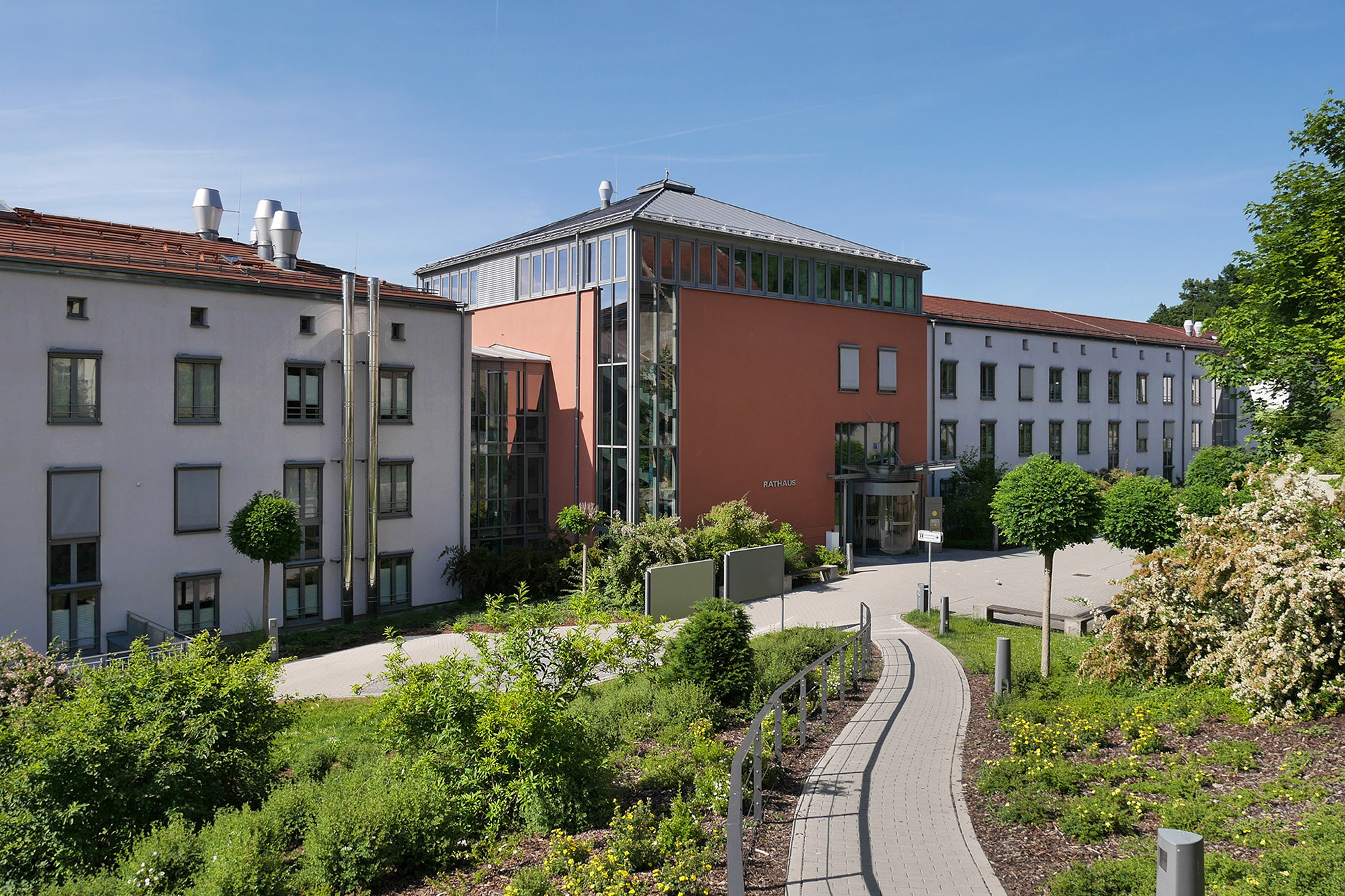
Rathaus Schwandorf

- Finanzamt Schwandorf
- Gesundheitsamt Schwandorf
- KFZ-Zulassungstelle Schwandorf
- Agentur für Arbeit Schwandorf
- Amt für Ernährung Landwirtschaft u Forsten Schwandorf
- Staatlich anerkannte Beratungsstelle für Schwangerschaftsfragen
- Familienkasse Schwandorf
- Jugendamt Schwandorf
- Veterinäramt Schwandorf
- Bauhof

== Economy and industries ==
Schwandorf is the most important retail centre in the district of the same name.

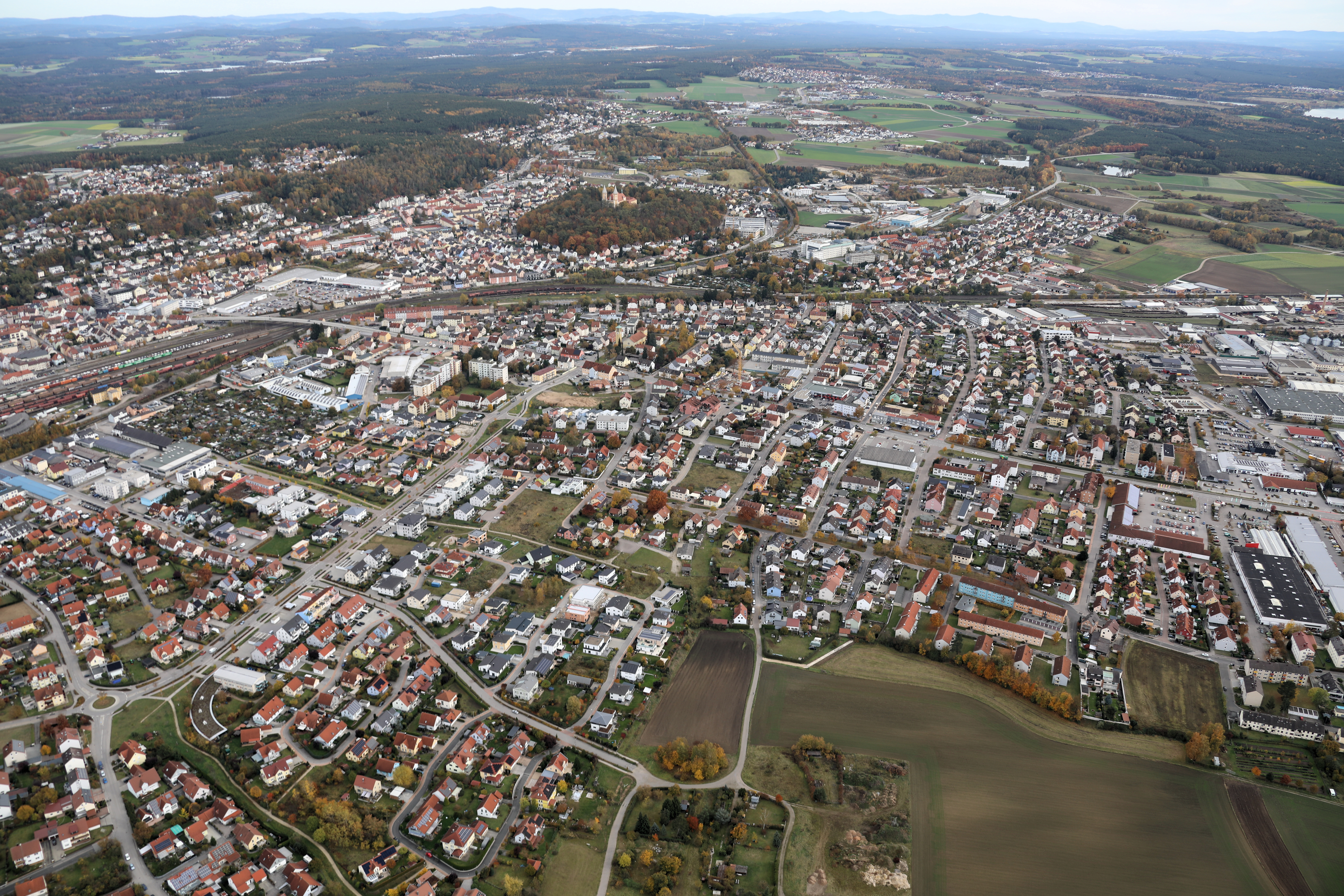
Schwandorf Oberpfalz

At the district level, the district of Schwandorf in Upper Palatinate is the undisputed number 1 in terms of tax revenue. Its income is even comparable to that of the districts around Munich. There are 130 large industrial companies and 15,000 jobs. Schwandorf's largest employer is currently meiller direct GmbH. Benteler is also a major employer in the district. In the Wackersdorf Innovation Park, BMW AG, nine manufacturing suppliers and three service companies now make up the circle of partners at the Wackersdorf Innovation Park with around 2,700 employees. There is also a branch of Läpple AG with around 800 employees.

Meillerghp was Schwandorf's largest employer with around 1,200 employees. The former subsidiary of the Austrian Post was one of the largest direct marketing companies in Europe. Following the sale in 2015 to the Paragon Group, based in Dublin, Ireland, the company has been trading under the new company name Paragon Customer Communications Schwandorf GmbH since May 1, 2018.

In the manufacturing sector, the processing industry is an important economic factor. The most important employers here are to be found in the printing industry and in automotive supplies. Nabaltec AG, a company in the chemical industry, has its headquarters in Schwandorf. Schwandorf is the headquarters of Schmack Biogas GmbH, which designs, builds and operates biogas plants. On July 14, 2008, the company put Europe's largest biogas plant into operation in Schwandorf.

== Transportation ==
Schwandorf with its railway station (Schwandorf station) is the most important hub for regional trains operated by the Oberpfalzbahn of the Länderbahn in (Marktredwitz via Weiden to Regensburg and eastwards to Furth and Lam).

=== Public transportation ===
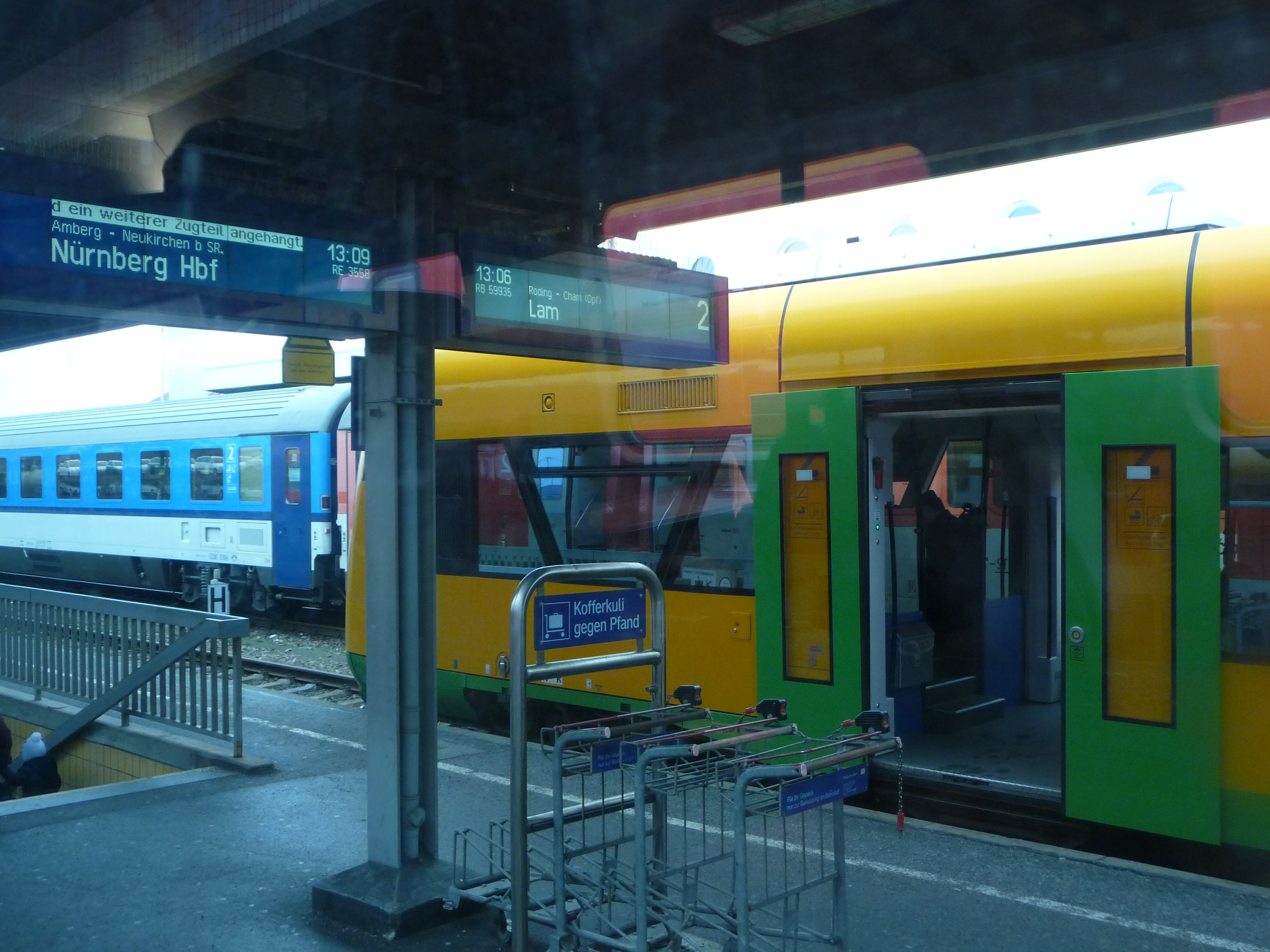
Schwandorf Train-Bus station

Schwandorf belongs to the Regensburg Transport Association (RVV).

The Schwandorf city and the other cities in the Schwandorf district are well connected with the Schwandorf City Bus Network.

=== Road connectivity ===
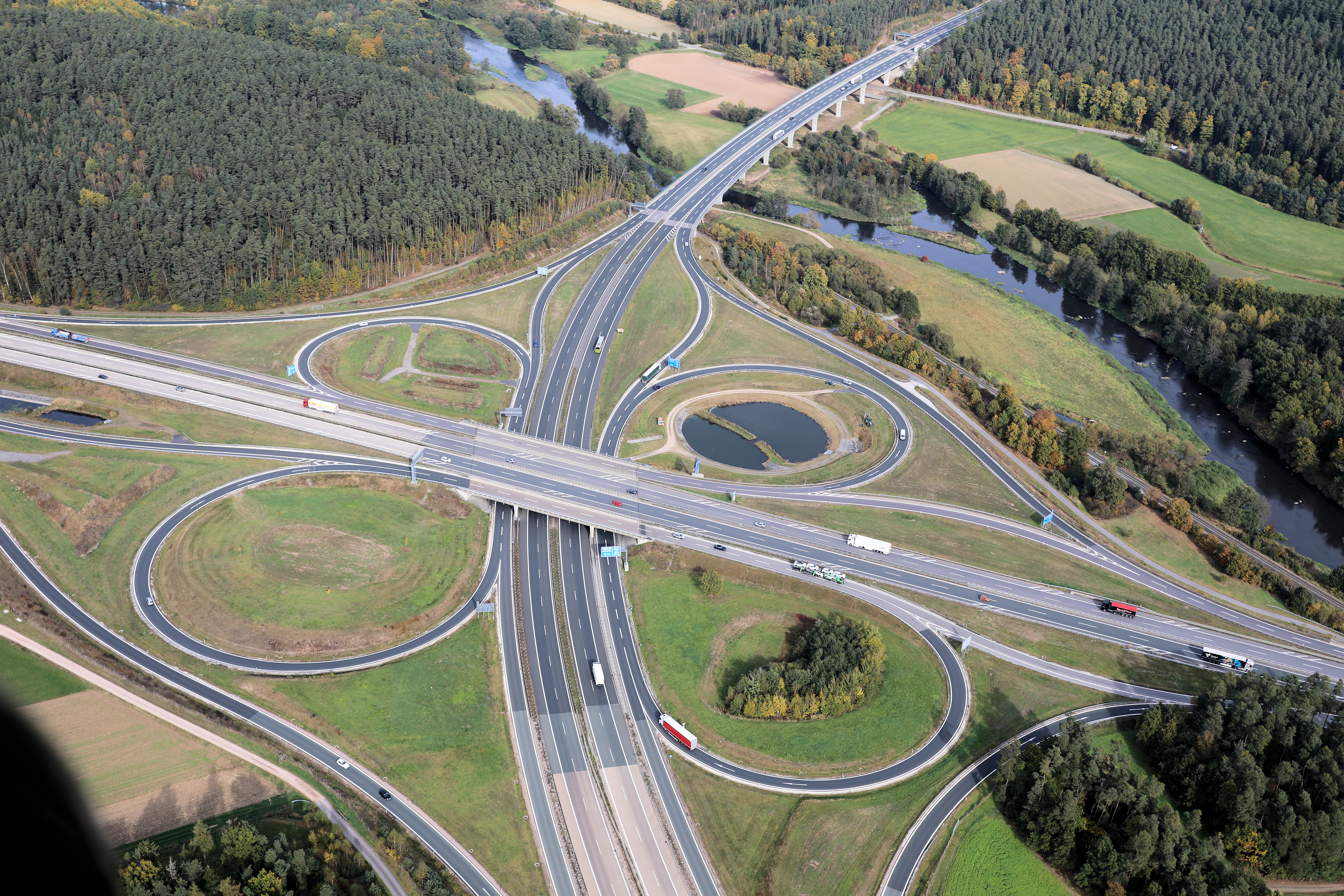
The Oberpfälzer Wald motorway junction (A 6/A 93) in the northern district of Schwandorf (2021)

- Directly located on the A 93 as an important north–south connection between the Hochfranken A 72 motorway triangle and the Holledau A 9 triangle. Continuous traffic axis Berlin – Leipzig – Hof – Weiden – Regensburg – Munich (three junctions in the city area: Schwandorf-Nord (Fronberg, B 85 ), Schwandorf-Mitte (Wackersdorf, B 85 ) and Schwandorf-Süd (Klardorf)).
- The distance to the A 6 in the direction of Amberg -Ost – Nuremberg – Heilbronn is twelve kilometers via the B 85, and to the A 6 in the direction of Kreuz Oberpfälzer Wald – Waidhaus – Plzeň – Prague it is 25 kilometers via the A 93.
- B 15 Hof to the Inn Valley: Between the Altenstadt an der Waldnaab and Regensburg-Nord junctions, the B 15 was replaced by the A 93.
- B 85 (partially four-lane expansion) Bayreuth – Amberg – Schwandorf – Cham – Passau bypasses Schwandorf in the north.

=== Rail connectivity ===
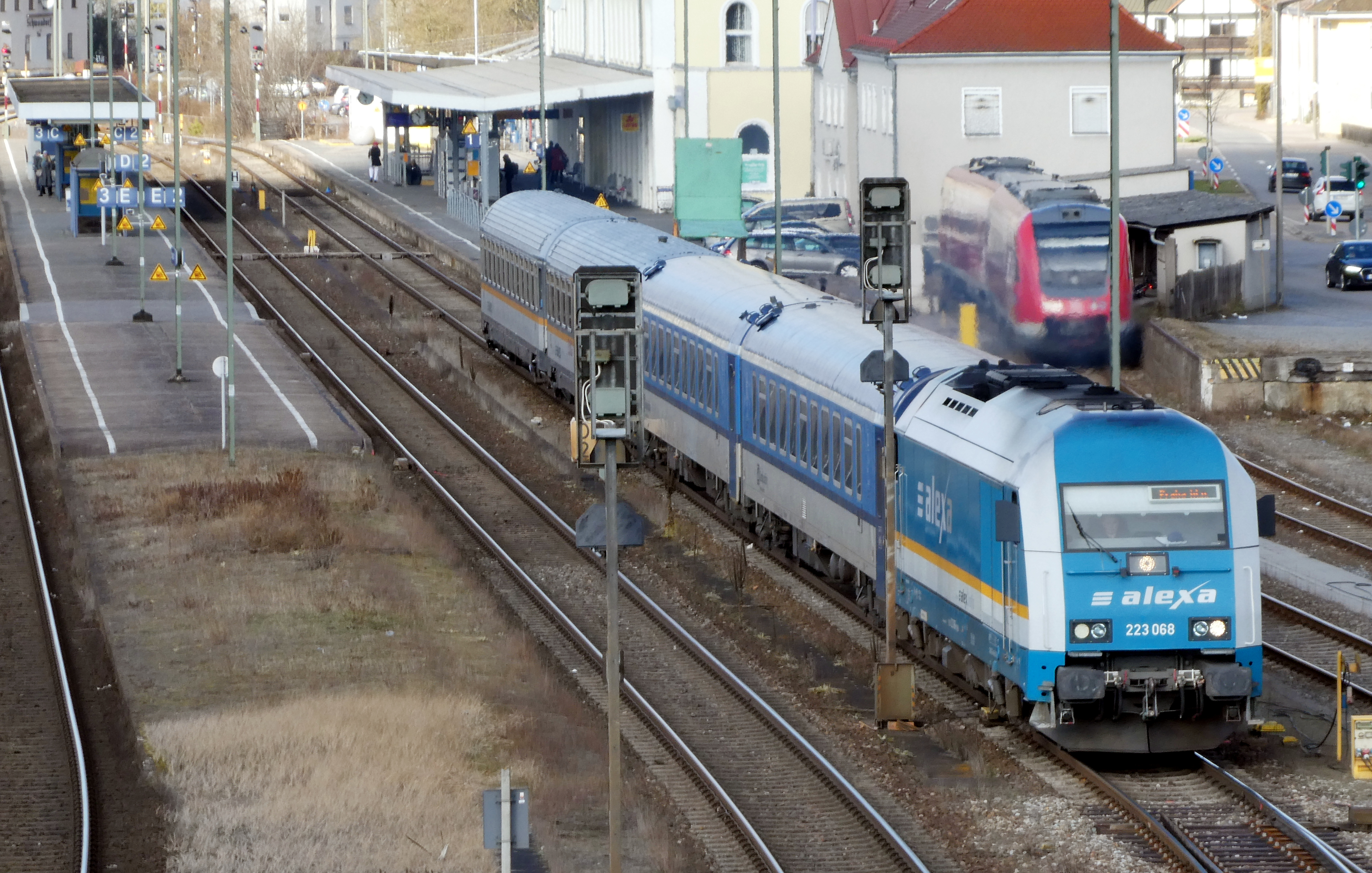
Schwandorf Bahnhof

The following routes converge at Schwandorf station:

- In south–north direction: railway line Regensburg–Weiden, continuing to Marktredwitz and Hof.
- In west–east direction: Nuremberg–Schwandorf railway line and Schwandorf–Cham–Furth im Wald railway line, continuing to Plzeň and Prague.
- In a south-east direction: the direct rail connection Munich-Regensburg-Schwandorf-Prague.
- In a west-south direction: the direct train connection Nuremberg-Amberg-Schwandorf-Regensburg (every two hours).
- In Regensburg and Nuremberg there are connections to IC and ICE trains

=== Air traffic ===
Schwandorf Airport has a 860 × 30 m grass runway.

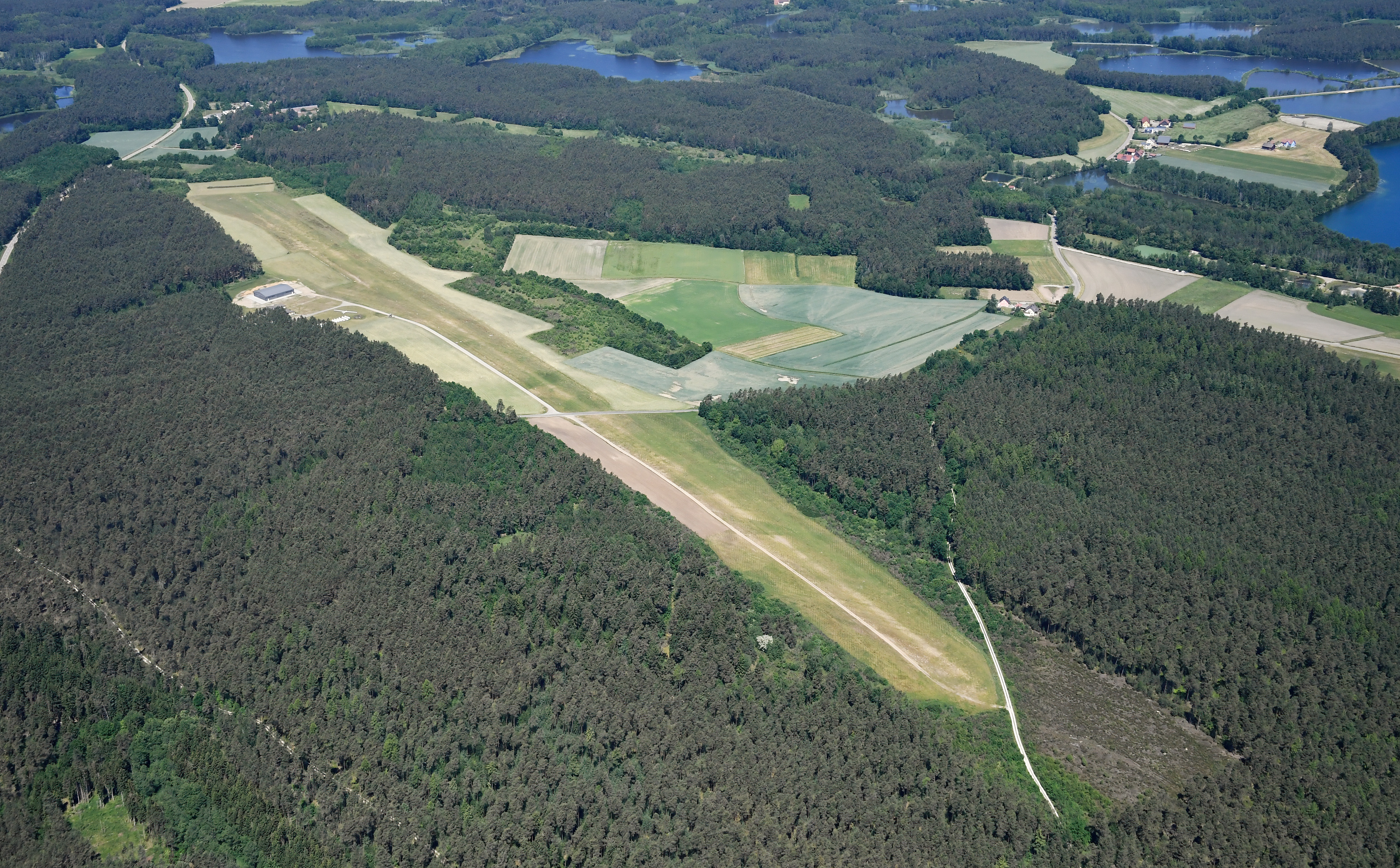

The airfield is located six kilometers east of the historic center of Schwandorf and three kilometers north of Wackersdorf. It is owned by the town of Schwandorf and operated by the Schwandorf Aviation Club.

International Airports are located nearby in Munich, Nuremberg and Frankfurt.

== Health ==
- Schwandorf has one of the most modern Hospitals in Germany, which is known as BarmHERZige Brüder Krankenhaus St. Barbara. In addition there are several other practitioners’ practices / clinics in around the city.

== Events ==
Twice a year the Schwandorf Volksfest takes place. This is the city's Volksfest.

- Epiphany Market, Sunday after 6 January (Market Square)
- May Market, 1st Sunday in May, shops open on Sunday (Old Town)
- Whitsun Festival (Krondorfer Anger)
- Corpus Christi Market, Sunday after Corpus Christi (Market Square)
- Music at market time, in summer every Saturday at 12.05 p.m. (St. Jakob Parish Church)
- Jakobi Market, Sunday after 25 July, shops open on Sunday (Old Town)
- Autumn market, last Sunday in October, Sunday shopping, so-called Coat Sunday (Old Town)
- Winter magic in Advent (market square and city park) - Christkindlmarkt Schwandorf
- Blowing the Christkindl, 24 December at 5 p.m. (Market Square)
- Citizens' festival every two years in July (entire old town) - Volksfest.
- Wendelinfest every two years in July (Wendelinplatz)

== Sports ==
The town's association football club, 1. FC Schwandorf, experienced its greatest success in the late 1950s and the 1960s when it spent thirteen seasons in the third division Bayernliga.

== Media ==
- Radio Charivari, private radio station for the East Bavaria region. Frequencies for Schwandorf: 98.8 and 105.9 MHz.
- Gong FM, private radio station for the Regensburg region. Frequency for Schwandorf: 97.3 MHz.
- Local editorial office of Mittelbayerische Zeitung
- Local editorial office of the weekly newspaper

== Theatre and music ==
The Schwandorf Marionette Theatre was founded in 1977. One of the basements on Fronberger Straße is used as a venue for concerts and theater.

The town's musical life is mainly shaped by private initiatives. These include the Schwandorf Music School, the Schwandorf Music Association (founded in 1854) with its brass band, the Schwandorf VHS Youth Brass Band and the Schwandorf Oratorio Choir (founded in 2000).

== Commerce ==
Schwandorf has grocery shops, clothes shops, household items shops and a large mall area. These fulfil the daily needs of the residents of Schwandorf district.

Notable shopping malls are: Globus & K+B expert Mall, Rewe Center, Müller Complex, OBI baumarkt and FREY Mode.

== International communities ==
Schwandorf has a diverse population. Many migrants are from Russia, Czech Republic, Turkey, Syria, Poland, Italy, Romania, India and China.

== Towns and municipalities ==

Towns	Markt	Verwaltungsgemeinschaften	Municipalities
1. Burglengenfeld; 2. Maxhütte-Haidhof; 3. Nabburg¹; 4. Neunburg vorm Wald¹; 5. Nittenau; 6. Oberviechtach; 7. Pfreimd¹; 8. Schönsee¹; 9. Schwandorf; 10. Teublitz	1. Bruck in der Oberpfalz; 2. Neukirchen-Balbini¹; 3. Schwarzenfeld¹; 4. Schwarzhofen¹; 5. Wernberg-Köblitz; 6. Winklarn¹	1. Nabburg; 2. Neunburg vorm Wald; 3. Oberviechtach; 4. Pfreimd; 5. Schönsee; 6. Schwarzenfeld; 7. Wackersdorf	1. Altendorf; 2. Bodenwöhr; 3. Dieterskirchen; 4. Fensterbach; 5. Gleiritsch; 6. Guteneck; 7. Niedermurach; 8. Schmidgaden; 9. Schwarzach bei Nabburg; 10. Stadlern; 11. Steinberg am See; 12. Stulln; 13. Teunz; 14. Thanstein; 15. Trausnitz; 16. Wackersdorf; 17. Weiding

== Twin towns – sister cities ==
Schwandorf is twinned with:

- Libourne, France
- Sokolov, Czech Republic

Schwandorf also has friendly relations with Karamürsel in Turkey.

== Politics ==
- Schwandorf (electoral district)

== Notable people ==
- Caroline von Holnstein (1815-1859); see Gallery of Beauties
- Hans Schuierer (1931); local politician

== Literature ==
- Martin Zeiller: In: Matthäus Merian (ed.): (Volume 4 ). 1st edition. Matthaeus Merian, Frankfurt am Main 1644, p. 100 ( full text [ Wikisource ]).
- Bernhard M. Baron, The end of the war in 1945 in Schwandorf as reflected in literature, In: Oberpfälzer Heimat. Volume 66, 202', ISBN 978-3-947247-64-6, pp. 139–150.
- Georg Klitta : The Finale of the Second World War in Schwandorf. 1970, DNB 577236644.
- Johann Georg Hubmann : Chronicle of the town of Schwandorf. In: Chronicle of the Upper Palatinate. Volume I, Publisher Fedor Pohl, Amberg, 1865
- Joseph Pesserl: Chronicle and topography of Schwandorf. In: Proceedings of the Historical Association for Upper Palatinate and Regensburg. 1865. ( PDF on commons; reprint: 1989, ISBN 3-923006-78-0 ).
- Alois Schmid : Schwandorf. The long road from village to town. Lecture given at the LMU Munich on 22 July 2006 on the occasion of the town's 1000th anniversary.
- Franz Sichler, Wolfsteiner (ed.): Famous Schwandorf Personalities, accompanying text to the exhibition in the anniversary year 2006.
- Ludwig Weingärtner in collaboration with the city planning office: Schwandorf cultural guidance system. September 2006.
- Alfred Wolfsteiner: Schwandorf in the bombing (with archive photos). Sutton Verlag, 2005, ISBN 3-89702-803-4.
- City of Schwandorf (ed.): Schwandorf in history and present. City chronicle in 2 volumes, Schwandorf 2001.
- Alfred Wolfsteiner: Schwandorf 1000 years of history on the Naab. 2006, DNB 980609844.
- Schwandorf city directory. Edition 2007.
- April 17, 1945 – Destruction of the town of Schwandorf. In: Günther Rambach: Swastika and St. Martin's Church – Fateful years in the Upper Palatinate 1933–1959. Ensdorf 2010, ISBN 978-3-00-031635-7.
