= Oberviechtach (Verwaltungsgemeinschaft) =

- Verwaltungsgemeinschaft
- Location of Oberviechtach within Schwandorf district
- Interactive map of Oberviechtach
- Location within Germany Location within Bavaria
- Coordinates: 49°27′N 12°23′E
- Country: Germany
- State: Bavaria
- Admin. region: Upper Palatinate
- District: Schwandorf
- Seat: Oberviechtach
- Subdivisions: 4 municipalities

Area
  - Total: 105.33 km^{2} (40.67 sq mi)

Population (2025-12-31)
  - Total: 5,066
  - Density: 48.10/km^{2} (124.6/sq mi)
- Time zone: UTC+01:00 (CET)
  - Summer (DST): UTC+02:00 (CEST)
- Website: www.vg-oberviechtach.de

Oberviechtach is a Verwaltungsgemeinschaft (municipal association) in the district of Schwandorf in Bavaria, Germany. Its seat is in Oberviechtach, itself not part of the Verwaltungsgemeinschaft.

It consists of the following municipalities:

1. Gleiritsch
2. Niedermurach
3. Teunz
4. Winklarn
