= Teublitz =

- Town
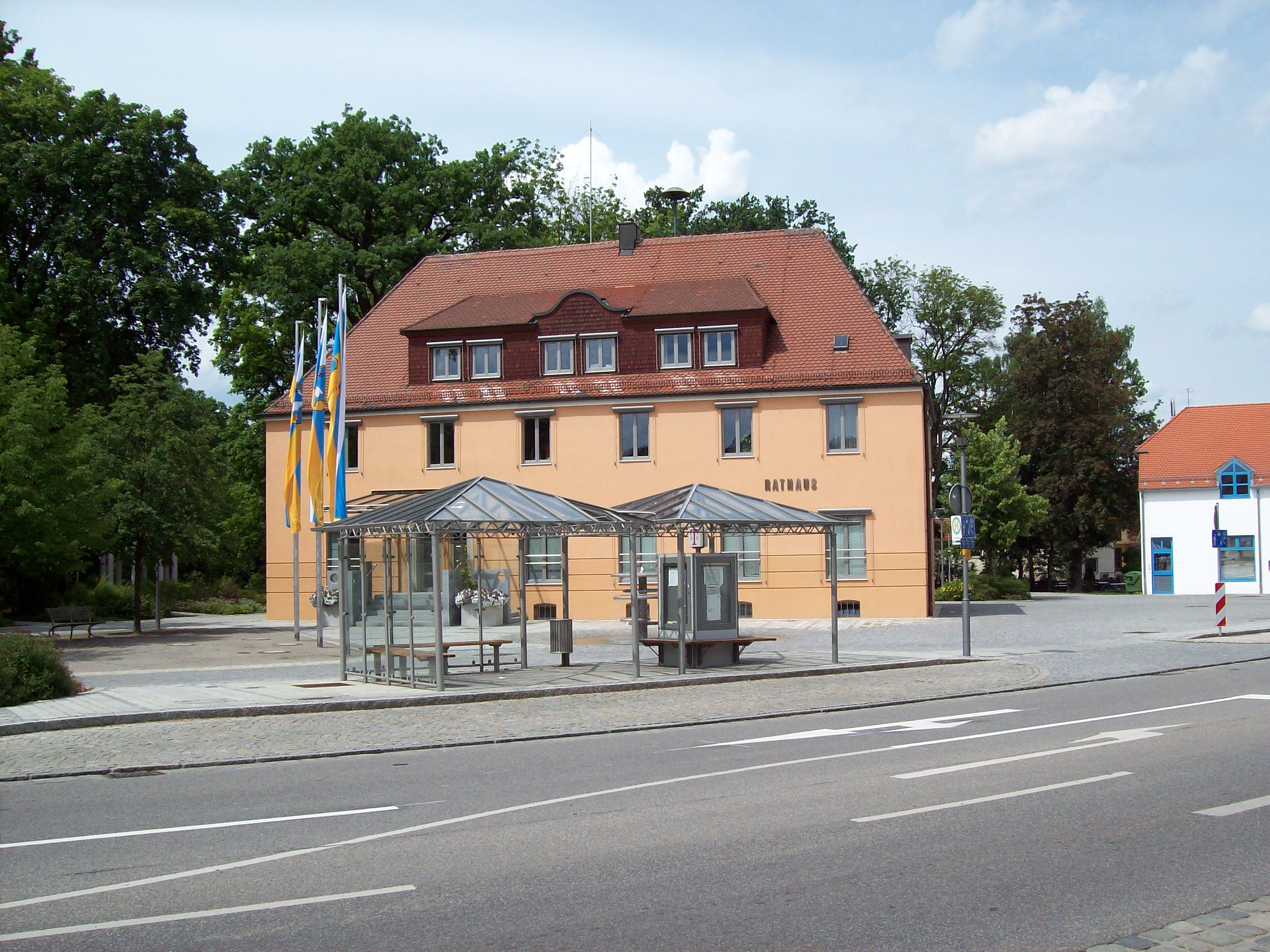
- Town hall

- Coat of arms

- Location of Teublitz within Schwandorf district
- Interactive map of Teublitz
- Location within Germany Location within Bavaria
- Coordinates: 49°13′15″N 12°5′7″E
- Country: Germany
- State: Bavaria
- Admin. region: Oberpfalz
- District: Schwandorf
- Subdivisions: 4 Stadtteile

Government
  - Mayor (2020–26): Thomas Beer (CSU)

Area
  - Total: 38.23 km^{2} (14.76 sq mi)
- Elevation: 352 m (1,155 ft)

Population (2025-12-31)
  - Total: 8,114
  - Density: 212.2/km^{2} (549.7/sq mi)
- Time zone: UTC+01:00 (CET)
  - Summer (DST): UTC+02:00 (CEST)
- Postal codes: 93158
- Dialling codes: 0 94 71
- Vehicle registration: SAD
- Website: www.teublitz.de

Teublitz (German pronunciation: [ˈtɔʏblɪts]) is a town in the district of Schwandorf, in Bavaria, Germany. It is situated on the river Naab, 12 km south of Schwandorf, and 23 km north of Regensburg.

== Twin cities ==
- Baborów, Opole Voivodeship, Poland
- Blovice, Plzeň Region, Czech Republic
