= Nabburg (Verwaltungsgemeinschaft) =

- Verwaltungsgemeinschaft
- Location of Nabburg within Schwandorf district
- Interactive map of Nabburg
- Location within Germany Location within Bavaria
- Coordinates: 49°27′N 12°11′E
- Country: Germany
- State: Bavaria
- Admin. region: Upper Palatinate
- District: Schwandorf
- Seat: Nabburg
- Subdivisions: 3 municipalities

Area
  - Total: 120.6 km^{2} (46.6 sq mi)

Population (2025-12-31)
  - Total: 7,952
  - Density: 65.94/km^{2} (170.8/sq mi)
- Time zone: UTC+01:00 (CET)
  - Summer (DST): UTC+02:00 (CEST)
- Website: www.nabburg.de

Nabburg is a Verwaltungsgemeinschaft (municipal association) in the district of Schwandorf in Bavaria, Germany. Its seat is in Nabburg.

It consists of the following municipalities:

1. Altendorf
2. Guteneck
3. Nabburg
