= Nittenau =

- Town
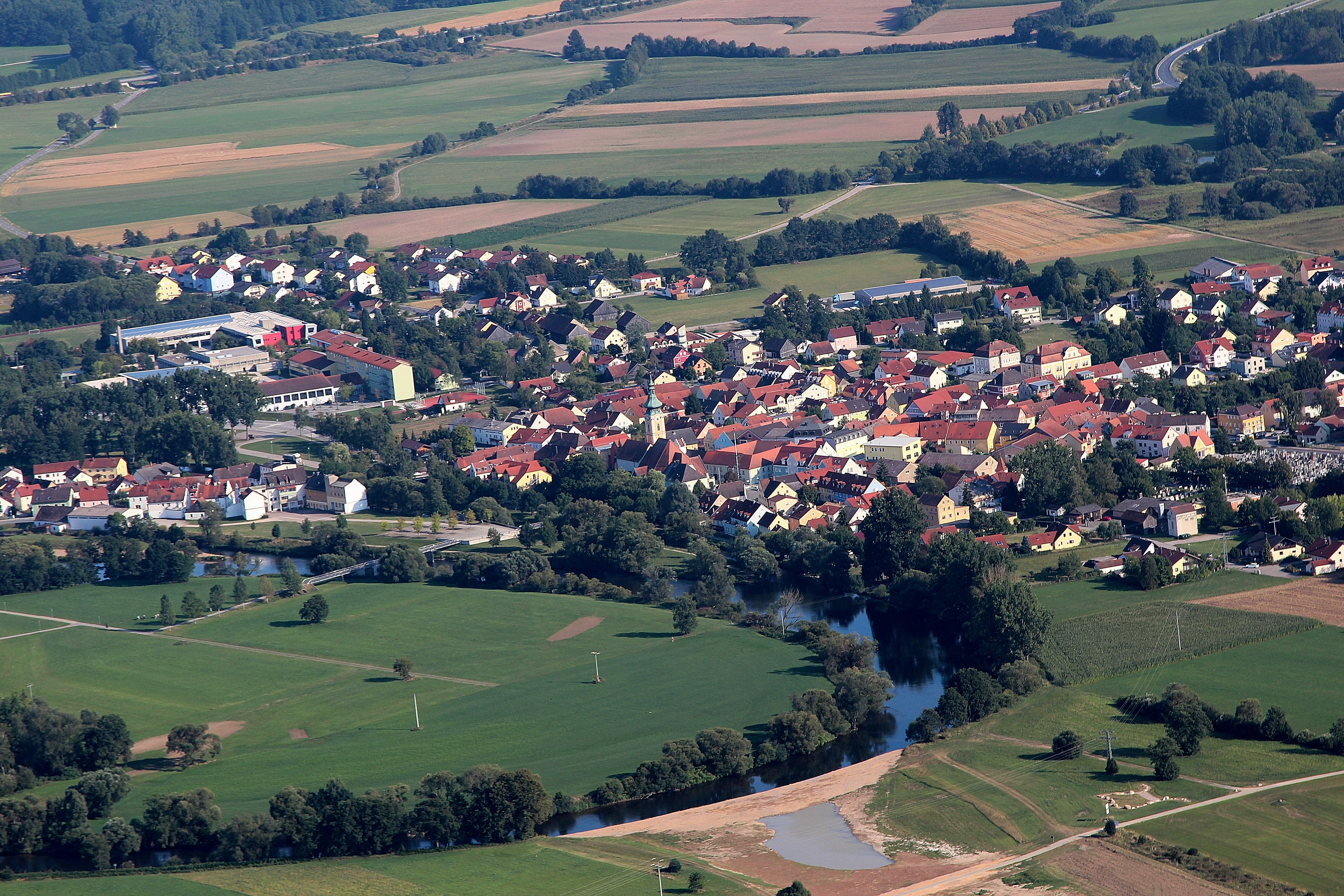
- Aerial view of the town

- Coat of arms

- Location of Nittenau within Schwandorf district
- Interactive map of Nittenau
- Location within Germany Location within Bavaria
- Coordinates: 49°12′N 12°16′E
- Country: Germany
- State: Bavaria
- Admin. region: Oberpfalz
- District: Schwandorf

Government
  - Mayor (2020–26): Benjamin Boml (FW)

Area
  - Total: 98.73 km^{2} (38.12 sq mi)
- Elevation: 350 m (1,150 ft)

Population (2025-12-31)
  - Total: 9,067
  - Density: 91.84/km^{2} (237.9/sq mi)
- Time zone: UTC+01:00 (CET)
  - Summer (DST): UTC+02:00 (CEST)
- Postal codes: 93149
- Dialling codes: 09436, 09463, 09464
- Vehicle registration: SAD
- Website: www.nittenau.de

Nittenau (German pronunciation: [ˈnɪtənaʊ]) is a municipality in the district of Schwandorf, in Bavaria, Germany. It is situated on the river Regen, 18 km southeast of Schwandorf, and 24 km northeast of Regensburg.

It is the "sister city" of Lake Zurich, Illinois.

== People ==
- Heribert Prantl (born 1953), journalist
