= Schwarzach bei Nabburg =

Schwarzach b.Nabburg
- Municipality
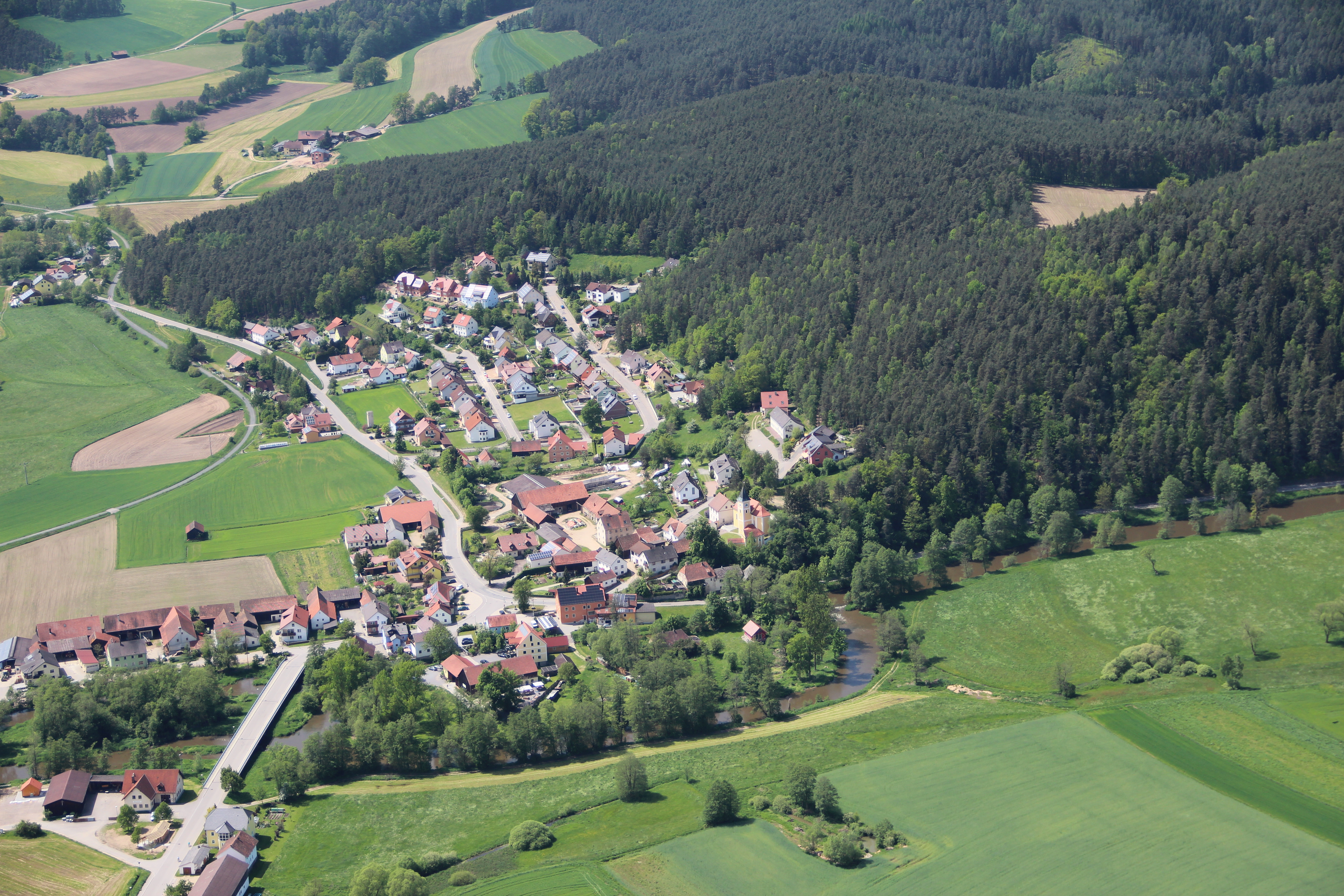
- Aerial view

- Coat of arms

- Location of Schwarzach b.Nabburg within Schwandorf district
- Interactive map of Schwarzach b.Nabburg
- Location within Germany Location within Bavaria
- Coordinates: 49°24′N 12°14′E
- Country: Germany
- State: Bavaria
- Admin. region: Oberpfalz
- District: Schwandorf
- Municipal assoc.: Schwarzenfeld

Government
  - Mayor (2020–26): Franz Grabinger

Area
  - Total: 27.37 km^{2} (10.57 sq mi)
- Elevation: 386 m (1,266 ft)

Population (2025-12-31)
  - Total: 1,367
  - Density: 49.95/km^{2} (129.4/sq mi)
- Time zone: UTC+01:00 (CET)
  - Summer (DST): UTC+02:00 (CEST)
- Postal codes: 92548
- Dialling codes: 0 96 75
- Vehicle registration: SAD
- Website: www.schwarzach-b-nabburg.de

Schwarzach bei Nabburg (German pronunciation: [ˈʃvaʁtsax baɪ ˈnaːpbʊʁk], lit. 'Schwarzach near Nabburg') is a municipality in the district of Schwandorf in Bavaria, Germany.

The municipal is divided in 15 smaller settlements.:

- Altfalter
- Auhof
- Dietstätt
- Furthmühle
- Oberwarnbach
- Öd
- Ödgarten
- Richt
- Sattelhof
- Schwarzach bei Nabburg
- Sindelsberg
- Unterauerbach
- Unterwarnbach
- Weiding
- Wölsendorf
