= Schwandorf (district) =

Coordinates: 49°20′N 12°10′E

- District
- Flag Coat of arms
- Country: Germany
- State: Bavaria
- Adm. region: Upper Palatinate
- Capital: Schwandorf

Government
  - District admin.: Thomas Ebeling (CSU)

Area
  - Total: 1,472.88 km^{2} (568.68 sq mi)

Population (31 December 2025)
  - Total: 149,363
  - Density: 101.409/km^{2} (262.648/sq mi)
- Time zone: UTC+01:00 (CET)
  - Summer (DST): UTC+02:00 (CEST)
- Vehicle registration: SAD, BUL, NAB, NEN, OVI, ROD
- Website: landkreis-schwandorf.de

Schwandorf is a Landkreis (district) in Upper Palatinate in the eastern part of Bavaria, Germany. Neighboring districts are (from the east clockwise) Cham, Regensburg, Neumarkt, Amberg-Sulzbach, Neustadt an der Waldnaab, and the Czech Plzeň Region.

== Geography ==
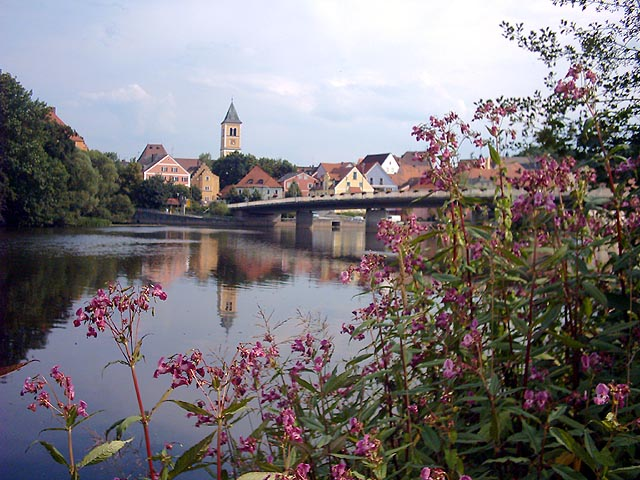
Burglengenfeld

The main rivers of the district are the Naab and the Regen.

=== Climate ===
The climate in this area has mild differences between highs and lows, and there is adequate rainfall year-round. The Köppen Climate Classification subtype for this climate is "Cfb". (Marine West Coast Climate/Oceanic climate).

== History ==
The district was created in 1972 by merging the previous districts of Burglengenfeld, Oberviechtach, Nabburg, Neunburg vorm Wald, and the previously district-free city Schwandorf.

== Coat of arms ==
The coat of arms shows the lion of the Palatinate to the left. The tower in the right half symbolizes the many fortresses and castles in the district. The wavy line and the mill wheel at the bottom stand for the many rivers and watermills in the district.

== Politics ==
Schwandorf (electoral district)

== Notable people ==
- Caroline von Holnstein (1815-1859); see Gallery of Beauties
- Hans Schuierer (1931); former district administrator

== Towns and municipalities ==
Clickable map of towns and municipalities in the district

Towns
1. Burglengenfeld
2. Maxhütte-Haidhof
3. Neunburg vorm Wald
4. Nittenau
5. Oberviechtach
6. Schwandorf
7. Teublitz
Markt
1. Bruck in der Oberpfalz
2. Wernberg-Köblitz
Municipalities
1. Bodenwöhr
2. Fensterbach
3. Schmidgaden

Verwaltungsgemeinschaften
1. Nabburg; 1. Altendorf; 2. Guteneck; 3. Nabburg^{1,2}	2. Neunburg vorm Wald; 1. Dieterskirchen; 2. Neukirchen-Balbini^{3}; 3. Schwarzhofen^{3}; 4. Thanstein	3. Oberviechtach; 1. Gleiritsch; 2. Niedermurach; 3. Teunz; 4. Winklarn^{3}	4. Pfreimd; 1. Pfreimd^{1,2}; 2. Trausnitz; 5. Schönsee; 1. Schönsee^{1,2}; 2. Stadlern; 3. Weiding	6. Schwarzenfeld; 1. Schwarzach bei Nabburg; 2. Schwarzenfeld^{1,3}; 3. Stulln; 7. Wackersdorf; 1. Steinberg am See; 2. Wackersdorf^{1}
^{1}seat of the Verwaltungsgemeinschaft; ^{2}town; ^{3}Markt
