= Schwarzenfeld (Verwaltungsgemeinschaft) =

- Verwaltungsgemeinschaft
- Location of Schwarzenfeld within Schwandorf district
- Interactive map of Schwarzenfeld
- Location within Germany Location within Bavaria
- Coordinates: 49°24′N 12°08′E
- Country: Germany
- State: Bavaria
- Admin. region: Upper Palatinate
- District: Schwandorf
- Seat: Schwarzenfeld
- Subdivisions: 3 municipalities

Area
  - Total: 81.17 km^{2} (31.34 sq mi)

Population (2025-12-31)
  - Total: 9,334
  - Density: 115.0/km^{2} (297.8/sq mi)
- Time zone: UTC+01:00 (CET)
  - Summer (DST): UTC+02:00 (CEST)
- Website: vg-schwarzenfeld.de

Schwarzenfeld is a Verwaltungsgemeinschaft (municipal association) in the district of Schwandorf in Bavaria, Germany. Its seat is in Schwarzenfeld.

It consists of the following municipalities:

1. Schwarzach bei Nabburg
2. Schwarzenfeld
3. Stulln
