= Fensterbach =

- Municipality
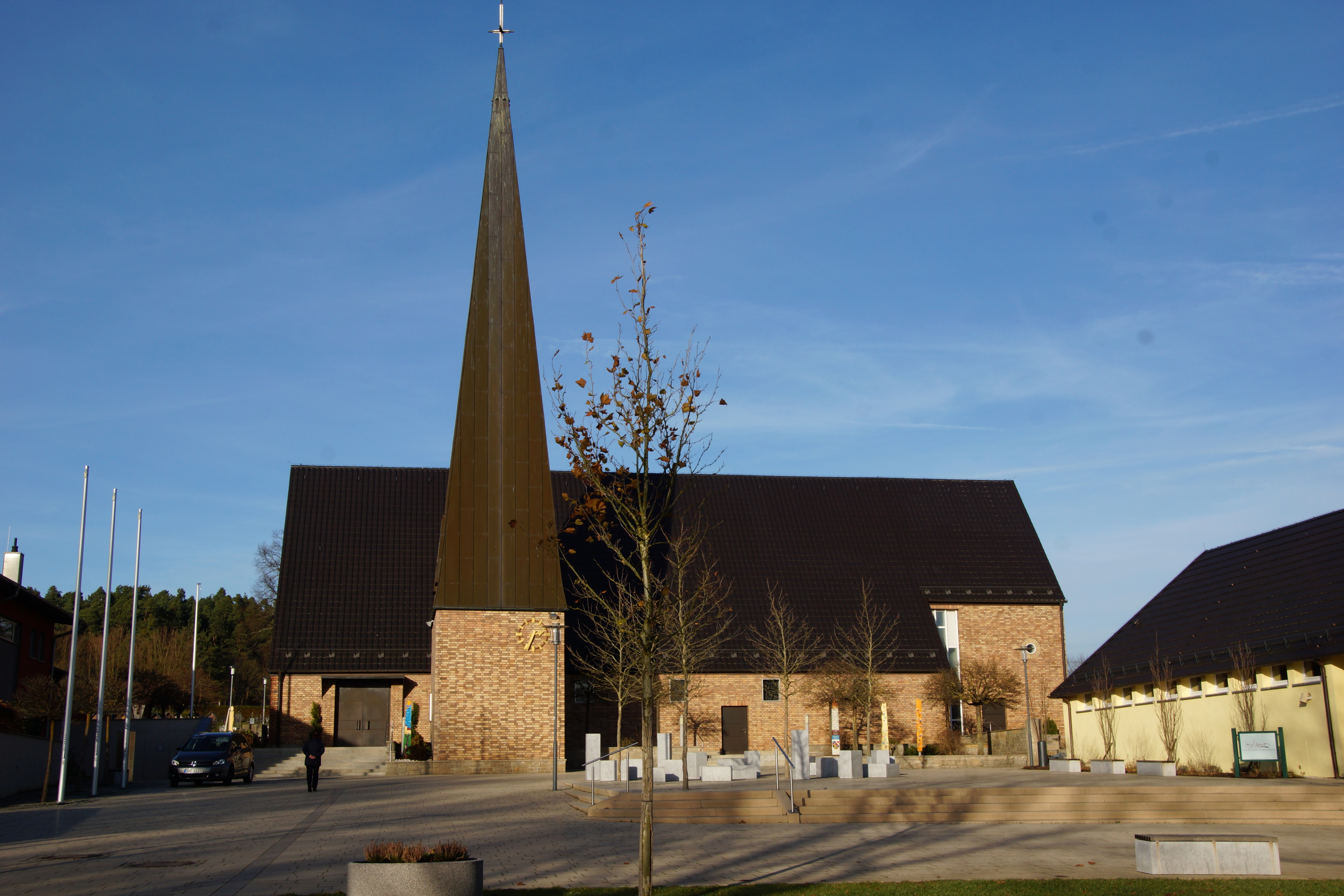
- Church of Saint Albertus Magnus in Dürnsricht

- Coat of arms

- Location of Fensterbach within Schwandorf district
- Interactive map of Fensterbach
- Location within Germany Location within Bavaria
- Coordinates: 49°24′N 12°3′E
- Country: Germany
- State: Bavaria
- Admin. region: Oberpfalz
- District: Schwandorf

Government
  - Mayor (2020–26): Christian Ziegler

Area
  - Total: 26.85 km^{2} (10.37 sq mi)
- Elevation: 390 m (1,280 ft)

Population (2025-12-31)
  - Total: 2,401
  - Density: 89.42/km^{2} (231.6/sq mi)
- Time zone: UTC+01:00 (CET)
  - Summer (DST): UTC+02:00 (CEST)
- Postal codes: 92269
- Dialling codes: 09438
- Vehicle registration: SAD
- Website: www.fensterbach.de

Fensterbach (German pronunciation: [ˈfɛnstɐbax]) is a municipality in the district of Schwandorf in Bavaria, Germany.
