= Niedermurach =

- Municipality
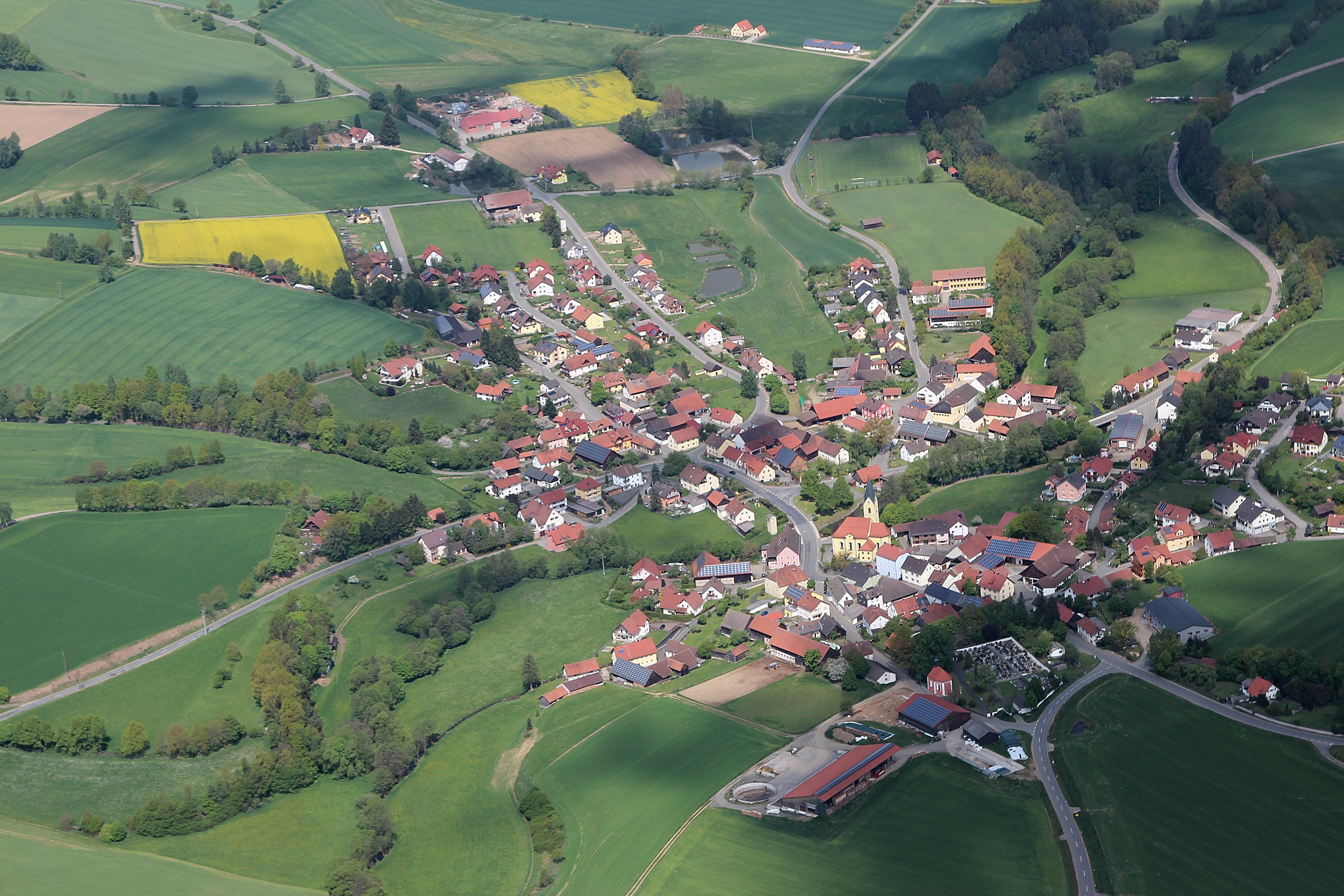
- Aerial view

- Coat of arms

- Location of Niedermurach within Schwandorf district
- Interactive map of Niedermurach
- Location within Germany Location within Bavaria
- Coordinates: 49°27′N 12°22′E
- Country: Germany
- State: Bavaria
- Admin. region: Oberpfalz
- District: Schwandorf
- Municipal assoc.: Oberviechtach

Government
  - Mayor (2020–26): Martin Prey

Area
  - Total: 29.96 km^{2} (11.57 sq mi)
- Elevation: 423 m (1,388 ft)

Population (2025-12-31)
  - Total: 1,261
  - Density: 42.09/km^{2} (109.0/sq mi)
- Time zone: UTC+01:00 (CET)
  - Summer (DST): UTC+02:00 (CEST)
- Postal codes: 92545
- Dialling codes: 0 96 71
- Vehicle registration: SAD
- Website: www.niedermurach.de

Niedermurach is a municipality in the district of Schwandorf in Bavaria, Germany.
