= Winklarn =

- Municipality
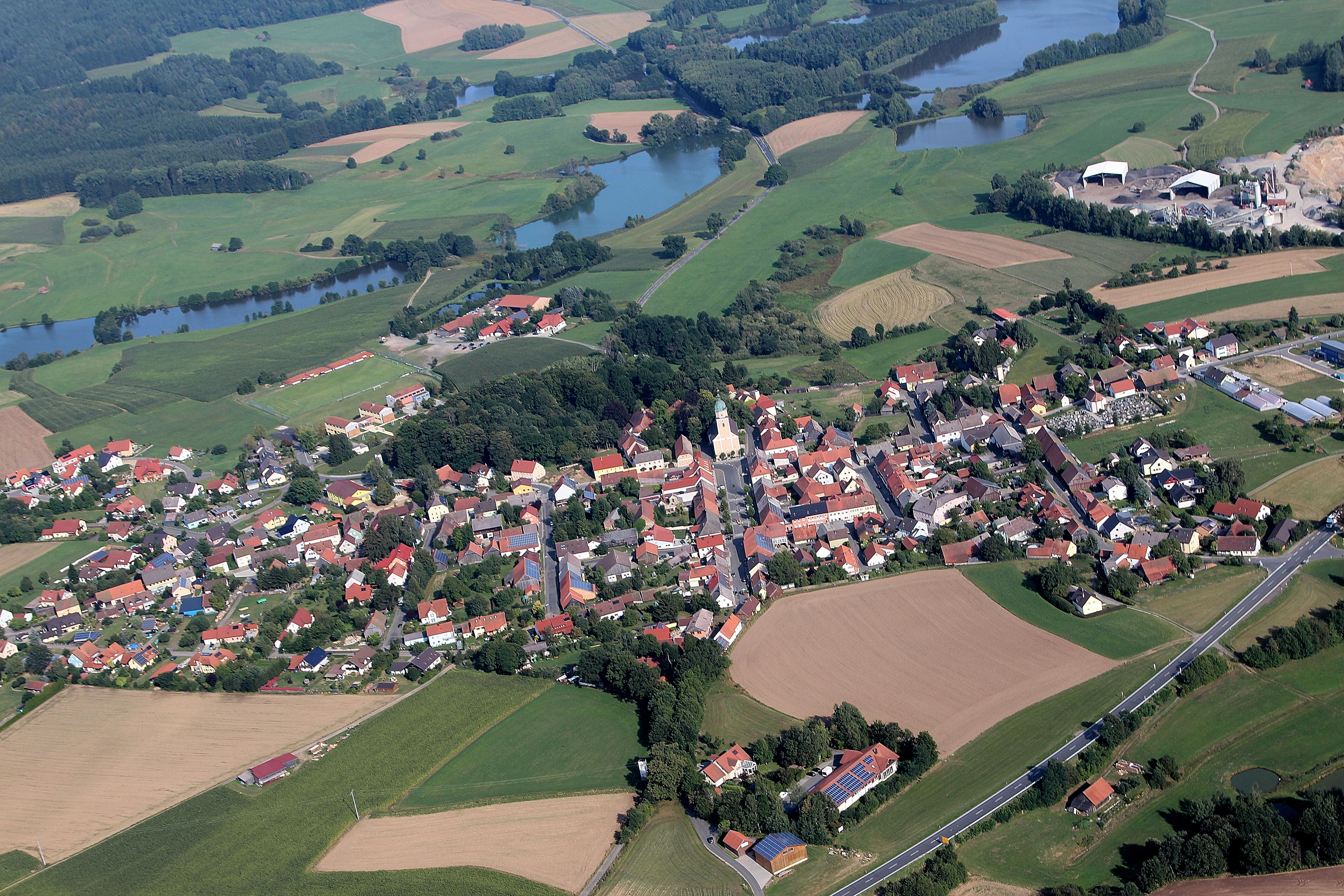
- Aerial view

- Coat of arms

- Location of Winklarn within Schwandorf district
- Interactive map of Winklarn
- Location within Germany Location within Bavaria
- Coordinates: 49°26′N 12°29′E
- Country: Germany
- State: Bavaria
- Admin. region: Oberpfalz
- District: Schwandorf
- Municipal assoc.: Oberviechtach

Government
  - Mayor (2020–26): Sonja Meier

Area
  - Total: 33.7 km^{2} (13.0 sq mi)
- Elevation: 516 m (1,693 ft)

Population (2025-12-31)
  - Total: 1,350
  - Density: 40.1/km^{2} (104/sq mi)
- Time zone: UTC+01:00 (CET)
  - Summer (DST): UTC+02:00 (CEST)
- Postal codes: 92559
- Dialling codes: 0 96 76
- Vehicle registration: SAD
- Website: www.vg-oberviechtach.de

Winklarn (German pronunciation: [ˈvɪŋklaʁn]) is a market town and municipality in the district of Schwandorf in Bavaria, Germany. In 2006, Winklarn had 1,446 inhabitants. Winklarn lies in the Upper Palatinate. In the North of Winklarn, there is a large forest, the so-called Frauenstein.

Winklarn was first mentioned in 1270.

In 1635, 229 inhabitants died of the plague. After the remaining inhabitants prayed to St. Sebastian, the Black Death stopped. Since this time, every year St. Sebastian's Day is celebrated specially due to a promise of the inhabitants at that time.

In 1822, a large fire devastated the centre of Winklarn. Afterwards, the large rectangular (134 by 26 metres (440 ft × 85 ft)) market place was built.

In 1972, the former communities Muschenried, Haag, Schneeberg, and Pondorf were incorporated.

Winklarn lies directly at the National Road B 22 and the distances to the next motorways (A 6, A 93) are around 30 km (19 mi). Until 1986, there was also a train station. In Winklarn, there is a kindergarten and a primary school.
