= Maxhütte-Haidhof =

- Town
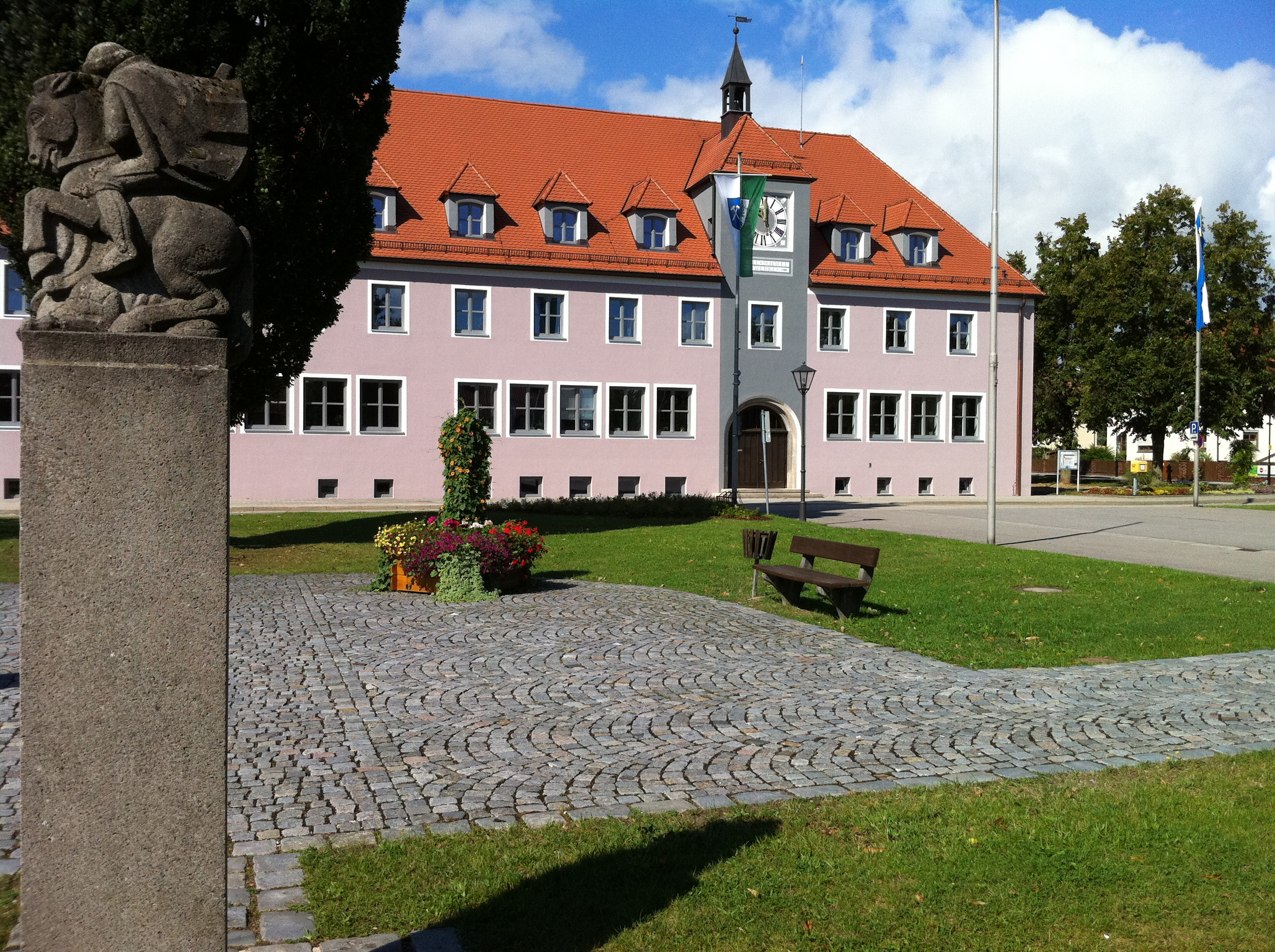
- Town hall

- Coat of arms

- Location of Maxhütte-Haidhof within Schwandorf district
- Interactive map of Maxhütte-Haidhof
- Location within Germany Location within Bavaria
- Coordinates: 49°12′N 12°6′E
- Country: Germany
- State: Bavaria
- Admin. region: Oberpfalz
- District: Schwandorf

Government
  - Mayor (2020–26): Rudolf Seidl (UWM)

Area
  - Total: 34.69 km^{2} (13.39 sq mi)
- Elevation: 416 m (1,365 ft)

Population (2025-12-31)
  - Total: 12,075
  - Density: 348.1/km^{2} (901.5/sq mi)
- Time zone: UTC+01:00 (CET)
  - Summer (DST): UTC+02:00 (CEST)
- Postal codes: 93142
- Dialling codes: 0 94 71
- Vehicle registration: SAD
- Website: www.maxhuette-haidhof.de

Maxhütte-Haidhof (German: [ˈmaksˌhʏtə ˈhaɪthoːf]) is a municipality in the district of Schwandorf, in Bavaria, Germany. It is situated 21 km north of Regensburg.
