= Oberviechtach =

- Town
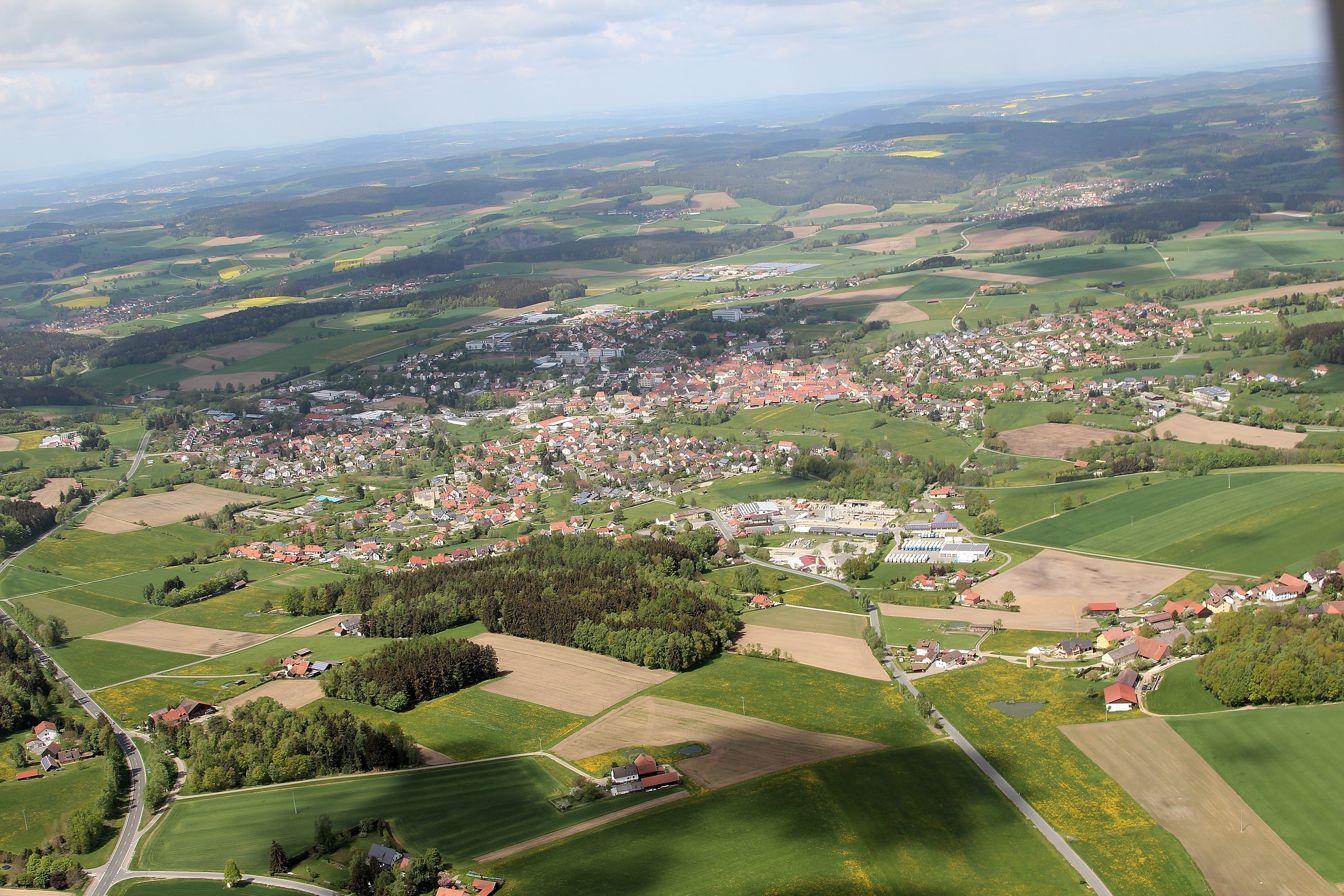
- Aerial view

- Coat of arms

- Location of Oberviechtach within Schwandorf district
- Interactive map of Oberviechtach
- Location within Germany Location within Bavaria
- Coordinates: 49°27′N 12°25′E
- Country: Germany
- State: Bavaria
- Admin. region: Oberpfalz
- District: Schwandorf

Government
  - Mayor (2020–26): Rudolf Teplitzky (Ind.)

Area
  - Total: 62.42 km^{2} (24.10 sq mi)
- Elevation: 50 m (160 ft)

Population (2025-12-31)
  - Total: 4,908
  - Density: 78.63/km^{2} (203.6/sq mi)
- Time zone: UTC+01:00 (CET)
  - Summer (DST): UTC+02:00 (CEST)
- Postal codes: 92526
- Dialling codes: 0 96 71
- Vehicle registration: SAD, BUL, NAB, NEN, OVI, ROD
- Website: www.oberviechtach.de

Oberviechtach (German: [oːbɐˈfiːçtax]) is a town in the district of Schwandorf, in Bavaria, Germany. It is situated 31 km (19 mi) southeast of Weiden in der Oberpfalz, and 27 km (17 mi) northeast of Schwandorf. It is famous for being the birthplace of Johann Andreas Eisenbarth. The name comes from pine (Fichte) which is also represented on the coat of arms of the town.

Oberviechtach was chartered and given market rights by Count Palatine Rudolf II and Ruprecht I on May 5, 1337.
