= Guteneck =

- Municipality
- Coat of arms

- Location of Guteneck within Schwandorf district
- Interactive map of Guteneck
- Location within Germany Location within Bavaria
- Coordinates: 49°27′N 12°17′E
- Country: Germany
- State: Bavaria
- Admin. region: Oberpfalz
- District: Schwandorf
- Municipal assoc.: Nabburg

Government
  - Mayor (2020–26): Johann Wilhelm (CSU)

Area
  - Total: 35.06 km^{2} (13.54 sq mi)
- Elevation: 390–603 m (1,280–1,978 ft)

Population (2025-12-31)
  - Total: 816
  - Density: 23.3/km^{2} (60.3/sq mi)
- Time zone: UTC+01:00 (CET)
  - Summer (DST): UTC+02:00 (CEST)
- Postal codes: 92543
- Dialling codes: 0 94 33 u. 0 96 75
- Vehicle registration: SAD
- Website: www.guteneck.de

Guteneck is a municipality in the district of Schwandorf in Bavaria, Germany.
