= Altendorf, Upper Palatinate =

Altendorf
- Municipality
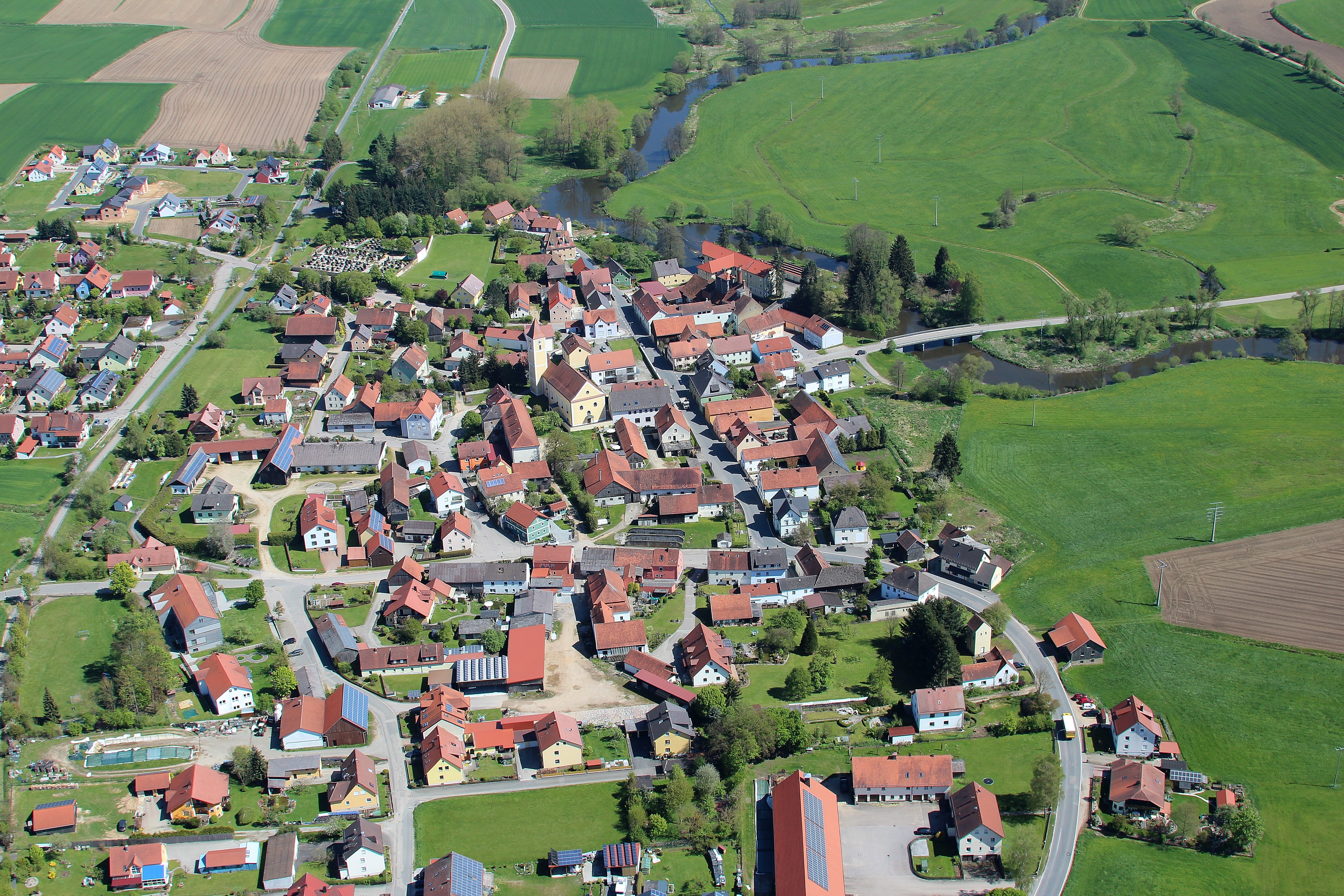
- Aerial view of Altendorf

- Coat of arms

- Location of Altendorf within Schwandorf district
- Interactive map of Altendorf
- Location within Germany Location within Bavaria
- Coordinates: 49°24′N 12°17′E
- Country: Germany
- State: Bavaria
- Admin. region: Oberpfalz
- District: Schwandorf
- Municipal assoc.: Nabburg

Government
  - Mayor (2020–26): Markus Schiesl

Area
  - Total: 23.17 km^{2} (8.95 sq mi)
- Elevation: 368–573 m (1,207–1,880 ft)

Population (2025-12-31)
  - Total: 880
  - Density: 38/km^{2} (98/sq mi)
- Time zone: UTC+01:00 (CET)
  - Summer (DST): UTC+02:00 (CEST)
- Postal codes: 92540
- Dialling codes: 0 96 75
- Vehicle registration: SAD
- Website: www.gemeinde-altendorf.de

Altendorf (German pronunciation: [ˈaltn̩ˌdɔʁf], lit. 'old village') is a municipality in the district of Schwandorf in Bavaria, Germany.
