= Schmidgaden =

- Municipality
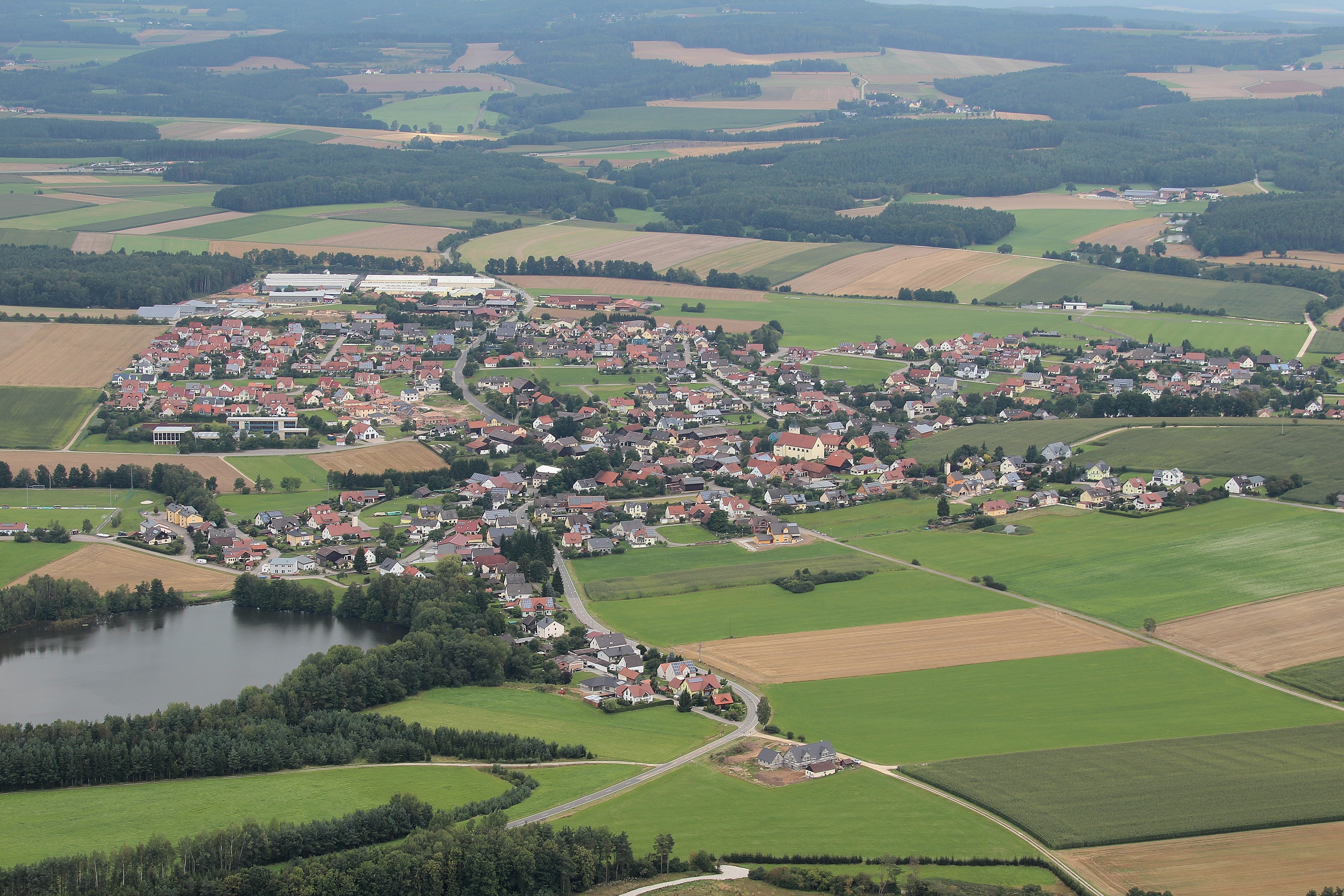
- Aerial view

- Coat of arms

- Location of Schmidgaden within Schwandorf district
- Interactive map of Schmidgaden
- Location within Germany Location within Bavaria
- Coordinates: 49°25′N 12°5′E
- Country: Germany
- State: Bavaria
- Admin. region: Oberpfalz
- District: Schwandorf

Government
  - Mayor (2020–26): Josef Deichl

Area
  - Total: 41.23 km^{2} (15.92 sq mi)
- Elevation: 387 m (1,270 ft)

Population (2025-12-31)
  - Total: 3,124
  - Density: 75.77/km^{2} (196.2/sq mi)
- Time zone: UTC+01:00 (CET)
  - Summer (DST): UTC+02:00 (CEST)
- Postal codes: 92546
- Dialling codes: 0 94 35
- Vehicle registration: SAD
- Website: www.schmidgaden.de

Schmidgaden is a municipality in the district of Schwandorf in Bavaria, Germany.

== Geography ==
Schmidgaden lies in the north of the Upper Palatinate. The municipality includes the following areas: Schmidgaden, Trisching, Wolfsbach, Rottendorf, Gösselsdorf, Littenhof

== History ==
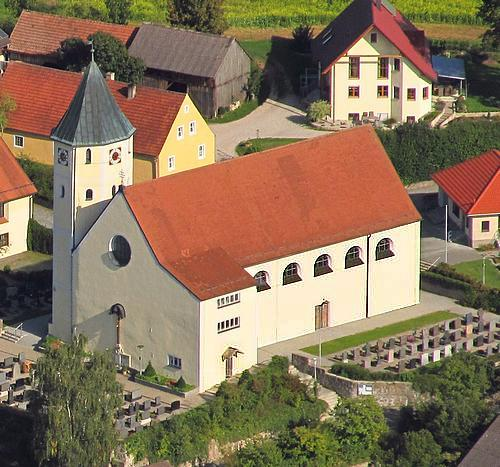
Church of the Assumption in Schmidgaden

The first documentary reference goes back to the year 1123. Schmidgaden belonged to the bursary Amberg as well as to the district court of the Bavarian electorate. Due to the administrative reform in the Bavarian Kingdom, with the municipality edict the political municipality Schmidgaden arose. In 1972 the municipalities of Rottendorf, Trisching as well as parts of Gösselsdorf were incorporated.

== Religions ==
While the majority of Schmidgaden is Catholic, Lutheran and a few other minorities can be found.
