= Teunz =

- Municipality
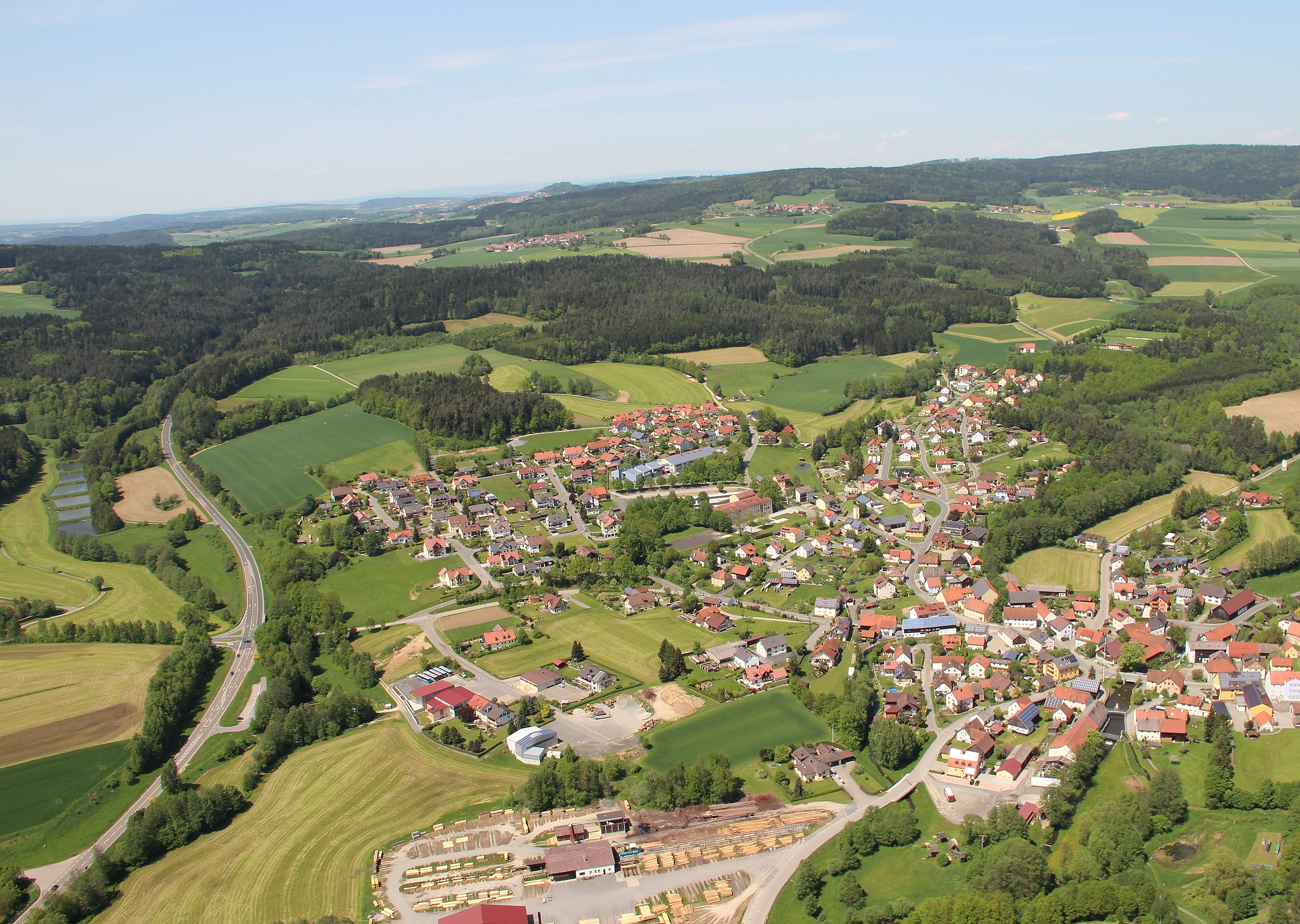
- Aerial view

- Coat of arms

- Location of Teunz within Schwandorf district
- Interactive map of Teunz
- Location within Germany Location within Bavaria
- Coordinates: 49°29′N 12°23′E
- Country: Germany
- State: Bavaria
- Admin. region: Oberpfalz
- District: Schwandorf
- Municipal assoc.: Oberviechtach

Government
  - Mayor (2020–26): Norbert Eckl (CSU)

Area
  - Total: 30.73 km^{2} (11.86 sq mi)
- Elevation: 448 m (1,470 ft)

Population (2025-12-31)
  - Total: 1,832
  - Density: 59.62/km^{2} (154.4/sq mi)
- Time zone: UTC+01:00 (CET)
  - Summer (DST): UTC+02:00 (CEST)
- Postal codes: 92552
- Dialling codes: 0 96 71
- Vehicle registration: SAD
- Website: www.teunz.de

Teunz (German pronunciation: [tɔʏnts]) is a municipality in the district of Schwandorf in Bavaria, Germany.
