= Neukirchen-Balbini =

- Municipality
- Coat of arms

- Location of Neukirchen-Balbini within Schwandorf district
- Interactive map of Neukirchen-Balbini
- Location within Germany Location within Bavaria
- Coordinates: 49°17′N 12°26′E
- Country: Germany
- State: Bavaria
- Admin. region: Oberpfalz
- District: Schwandorf
- Municipal assoc.: Neunburg vorm Wald

Government
  - Mayor (2020–26): Markus Dauch

Area
  - Total: 47.07 km^{2} (18.17 sq mi)
- Elevation: 512 m (1,680 ft)

Population (2025-12-31)
  - Total: 1,152
  - Density: 24.47/km^{2} (63.39/sq mi)
- Time zone: UTC+01:00 (CET)
  - Summer (DST): UTC+02:00 (CEST)
- Postal codes: 92445
- Dialling codes: 0 94 65
- Vehicle registration: SAD

Neukirchen-Balbini is a municipality in the district of Schwandorf in Bavaria, Germany.
