= Stulln =

- Municipality
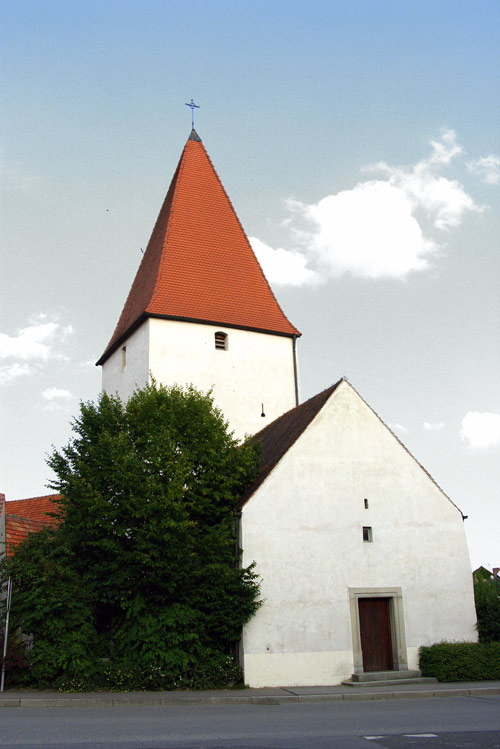
- Church of Saint Stephen

- Coat of arms

- Location of Stulln within Schwandorf district
- Interactive map of Stulln
- Location within Germany Location within Bavaria
- Coordinates: 49°25′N 12°8′E
- Country: Germany
- State: Bavaria
- Admin. region: Oberpfalz
- District: Schwandorf
- Municipal assoc.: Schwarzenfeld

Government
  - Mayor (2020–26): Hans Prechtl (CSU)

Area
  - Total: 15.53 km^{2} (6.00 sq mi)
- Elevation: 377 m (1,237 ft)

Population (2025-12-31)
  - Total: 1,705
  - Density: 109.8/km^{2} (284.3/sq mi)
- Time zone: UTC+01:00 (CET)
  - Summer (DST): UTC+02:00 (CEST)
- Postal codes: 92551
- Dialling codes: 0 94 35
- Vehicle registration: SAD
- Website: www.stulln.de

Stulln (German pronunciation: [ʃtʊln]) is a municipality in the district of Schwandorf in Bavaria, Germany.
