= Gleiritsch =

- Municipality
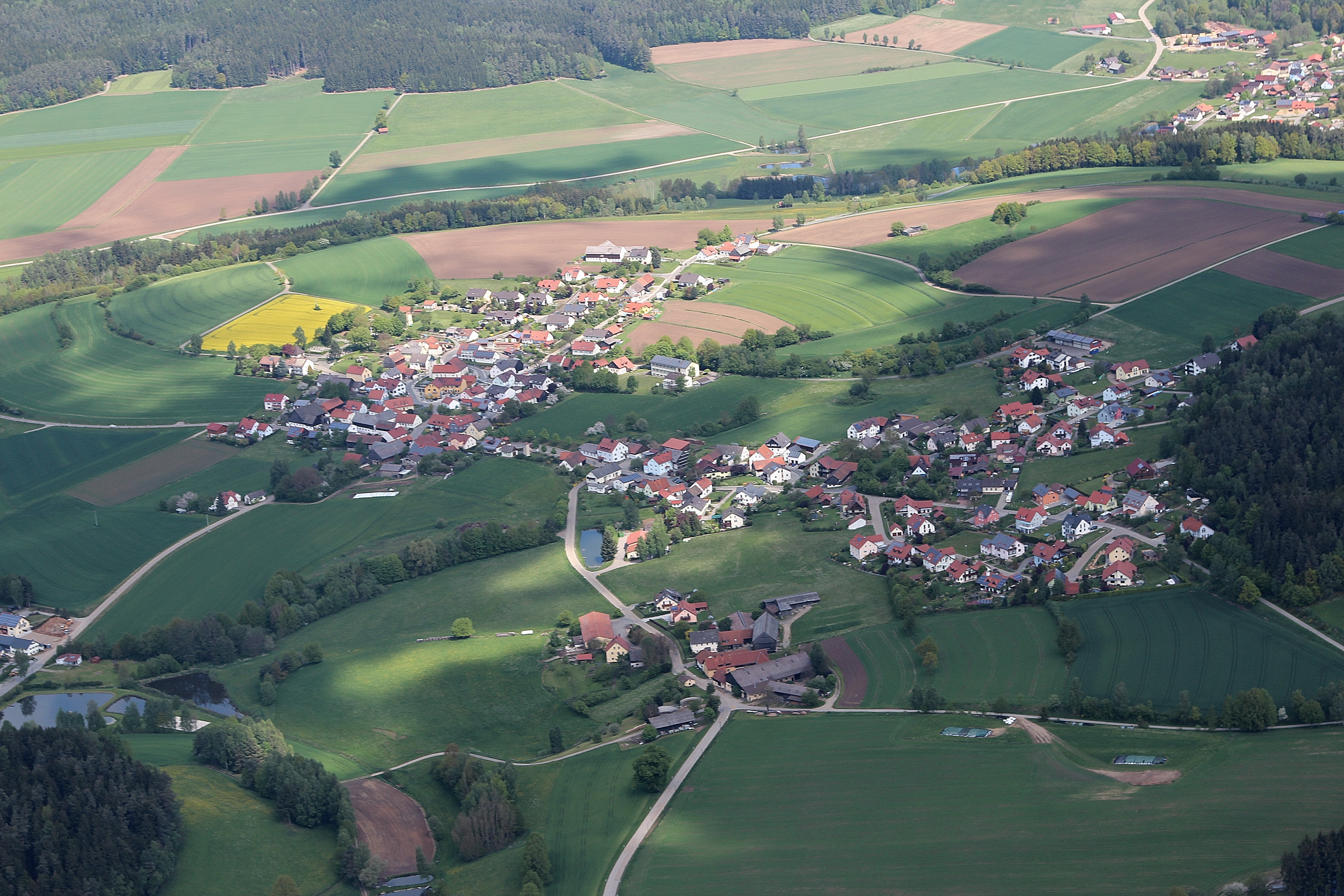

- Coat of arms

- Location of Gleiritsch within Schwandorf district
- Interactive map of Gleiritsch
- Location within Germany Location within Bavaria
- Coordinates: 49°30′N 12°20′E
- Country: Germany
- State: Bavaria
- Admin. region: Oberpfalz
- District: Schwandorf
- Municipal assoc.: Oberviechtach

Government
  - Mayor (2020–26): Josef Pretzl

Area
  - Total: 10.94 km^{2} (4.22 sq mi)
- Elevation: 493 m (1,617 ft)

Population (2025-12-31)
  - Total: 623
  - Density: 56.9/km^{2} (147/sq mi)
- Time zone: UTC+01:00 (CET)
  - Summer (DST): UTC+02:00 (CEST)
- Postal codes: 92723
- Dialling codes: 0 96 55
- Vehicle registration: SAD
- Website: www.gleiritsch.de

Gleiritsch (German pronunciation: [ˈɡlaɪʁɪtʃ]) is a municipality in the district of Schwandorf in Bavaria, Germany.
