= Bruck in der Oberpfalz =

Bruck i.d.Opf.
- Municipality
- Coat of arms

- Location of Bruck i.d.Opf. within Schwandorf district
- Interactive map of Bruck i.d.Opf.
- Location within Germany Location within Bavaria
- Coordinates: 49°14′47″N 12°18′23″E
- Country: Germany
- State: Bavaria
- Admin. region: Upper Palatinate
- District: Schwandorf

Government
  - Mayor (2020–26): Heike Faltermeier (CSU)

Area
  - Total: 52.46 km^{2} (20.25 sq mi)
- Elevation: 368 m (1,207 ft)

Population (2025-12-31)
  - Total: 4,151
  - Density: 79.13/km^{2} (204.9/sq mi)
- Time zone: UTC+01:00 (CET)
  - Summer (DST): UTC+02:00 (CEST)
- Postal codes: 92436
- Dialling codes: 0 94 34
- Vehicle registration: SAD
- Website: www.bruck-i-d-opf.de

Bruck in der Oberpfalz (German pronunciation: [ˈbʁʊk ʔɪn deːɐ̯ ˈʔoːbɐˌpfalts], lit. 'Bruck in the Upper Palatinate') is a market town in the district of Schwandorf in the Upper Palatinate, Bavaria, Germany.
