= Nabburg =

- Town
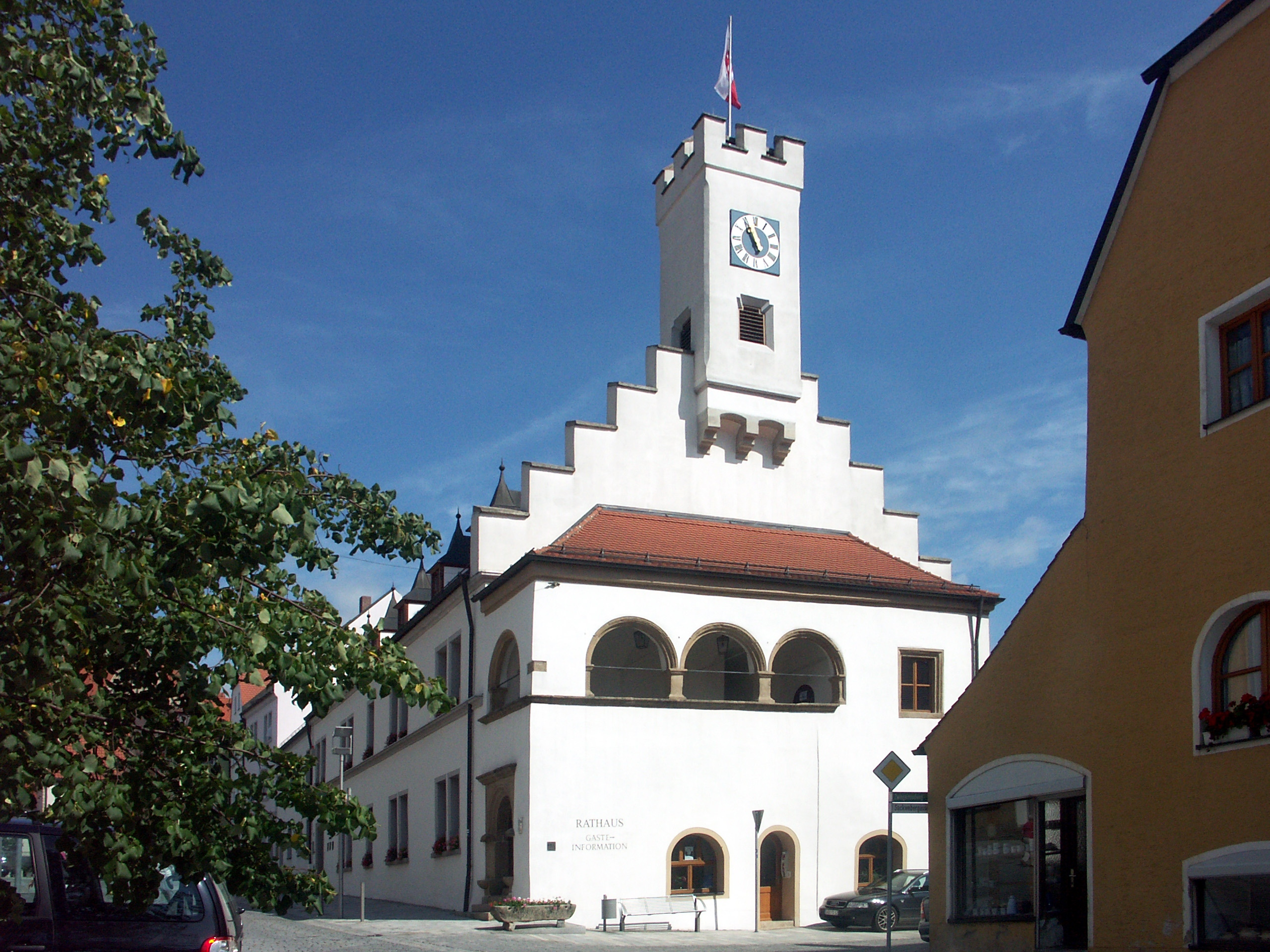
- Town hall

- Coat of arms

- Location of Nabburg within Schwandorf district
- Interactive map of Nabburg
- Location within Germany Location within Bavaria
- Coordinates: 49°27′N 12°10′E
- Country: Germany
- State: Bavaria
- Admin. region: Oberpfalz
- District: Schwandorf
- Municipal assoc.: Nabburg

Government
  - Mayor (2020–26): Frank Zeitler (CSU)

Area
  - Total: 62.38 km^{2} (24.09 sq mi)
- Elevation: 407 m (1,335 ft)

Population (2025-12-31)
  - Total: 6,256
  - Density: 100.3/km^{2} (259.7/sq mi)
- Time zone: UTC+01:00 (CET)
  - Summer (DST): UTC+02:00 (CEST)
- Postal codes: 92507
- Dialling codes: 0 94 33
- Vehicle registration: SAD, BUL, NAB, NEN, OVI, ROD
- Website: www.nabburg.de

Nabburg (German pronunciation: [ˈnaːpbʊʁk]) is a town in the district of Schwandorf, in Bavaria, Germany. It is situated on the river Naab, 23 km east of Amberg.

== Town division ==
28 districts belong to Nabburg.:

- Bärnmühle
- Bergelshof
- Brudersdorf
- Diendorf
- Diepoltshof
- Eckendorf
- Etzelhof
- Fraunberg
- Girnitz
- Grubhof
- Haindorf
- Haselhof
- Höflarn
- Kumpfmühle
- Lissenthan
- Nabburg
- Namsenbach
- Neusath
- Obersteinbach
- Passelsdorf
- Perschen
- Ragenhof
- Richtmühle
- Tauchersdorf
- Wiesensüß
- Wiesmühle
- Windpaißing
- Wölsenberg

== Climate ==
Climate in this area has mild differences between highs and lows, and there is adequate rainfall year-round. The Köppen Climate Classification subtype for this climate is "Cfb". (Marine West Coast Climate/Oceanic climate).

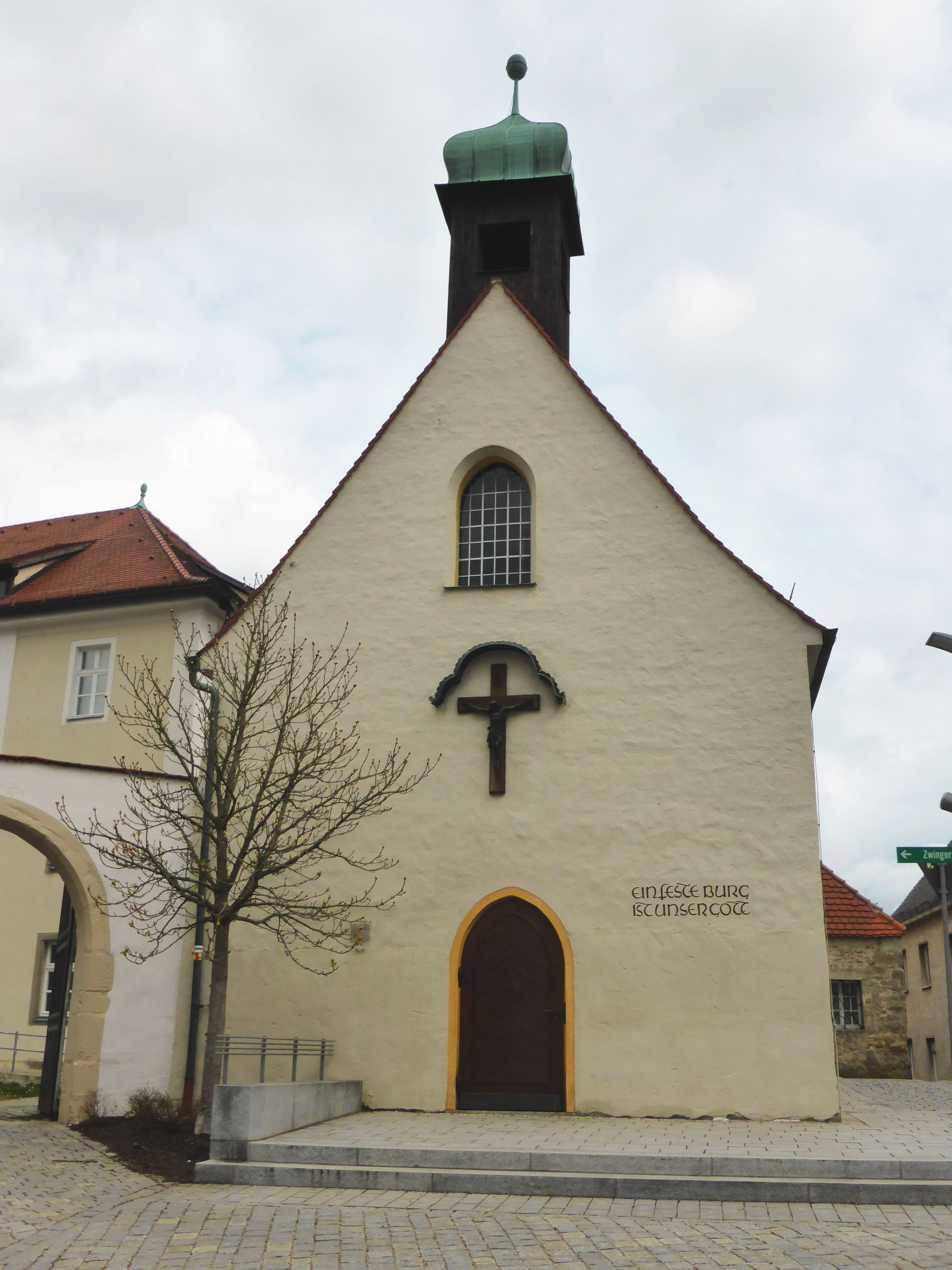
Nabburg Laurentius church

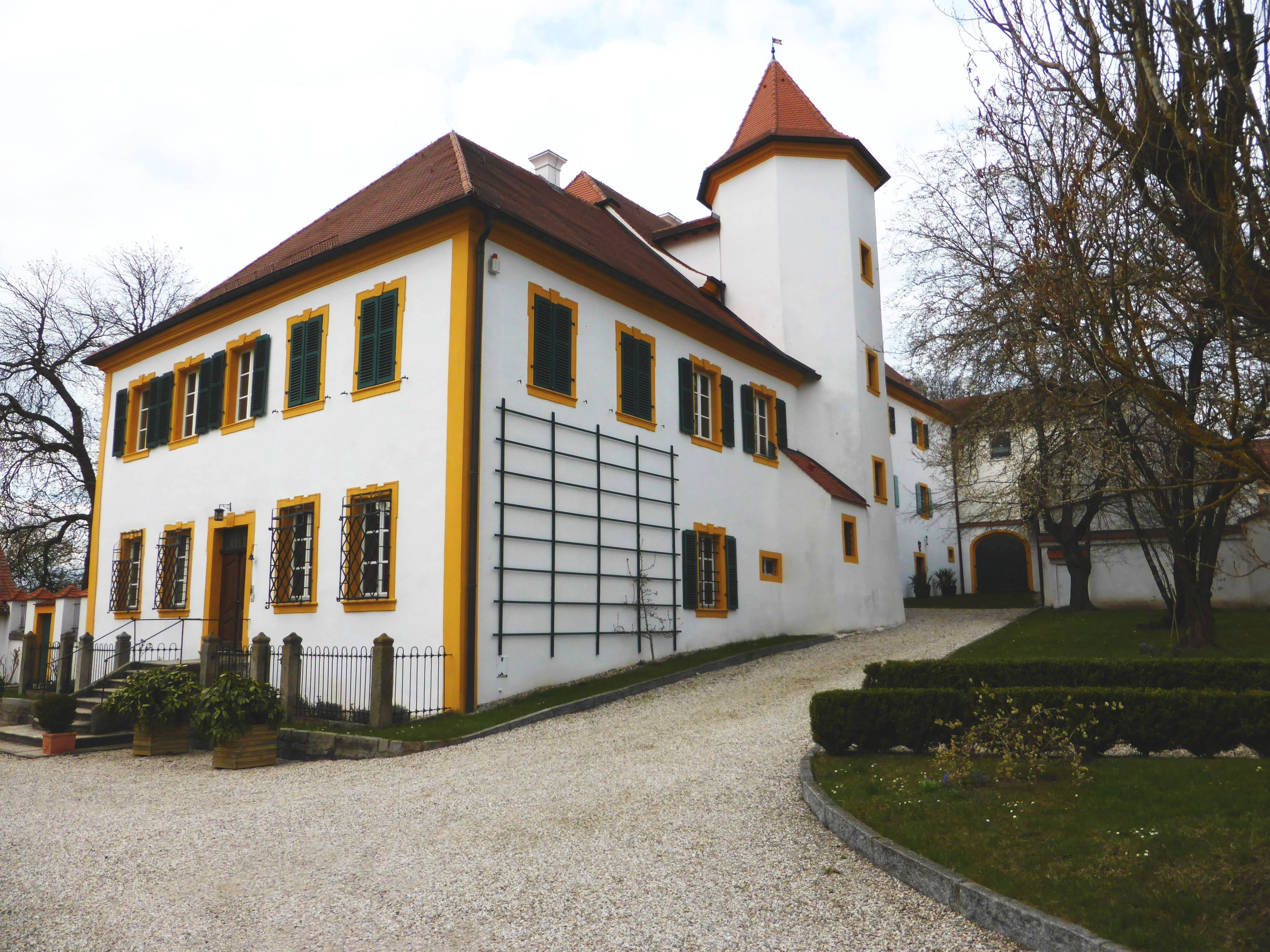
Neusath castle

== Sons and daughters of the town ==
- Peter Gollwitzer (born 1950), motivation psychologist, received the Max Planck Research Prize in 1990
- Wolfgang Hesl (born 1986), football goalkeeper
