= Mühlbach =

Mühlbach or Muhlbach may refer to:

== Places ==
=== Austria ===
- Hohenwarth-Mühlbach am Manhartsberg, a town in the district of Hollabrunn in Lower Austria
- Mühlbach am Hochkönig, a municipality in St. Johann im Pongau district, Salzburgerland
- Mühlbach im Pinzgau, a village in Zell am See District, Salzburg

=== France ===
- Muhlbach-sur-Munster (German: Mühlbach im Elsass), a commune Alsace
- Muhlbach-sur-Bruche (German: Mühlbach an der Breusch), a commune in Alsace

=== Germany ===
- Mühlbach, a small village in the municipality of Selb in Upper Franconia
- Mühlbach, a district of the town Bad Neustadt in Lower Franconia
- Mühlbach, Eppingen, a village in the town of Eppingen, Baden-Württemberg
- Mühlbach, Karlstadt, a village in the town of Karlstadt am Main, Bavaria
- Rieschweiler-Mühlbach, a municipality in Südwestpfalz district, in Rhineland-Palatinate
- Mühlbach am Glan, part of Altenglan in the Kusel district in Rhineland-Palatinate
- Mühlbach, part of Großkarolinenfeld in Bavaria
- Mühlbach, part of Vachendorf in Bavaria

=== Italy ===
- Mühlbach, South Tyrol, a municipality in South Tyrol

=== Luxembourg ===
- Muhlbach, Luxembourg, part of Contern

=== Romania ===
- the German name of Sebeș

== Rivers in Germany ==
- Mühlbach (Rur), of North Rhine-Westphalia
- Ladbergener Mühlbach, of North Rhine-Westphalia
- Mühlbach (Fichtenberger Rot), of Baden-Württemberg, tributary of the Fichtenberger Rot
- Mühlbach (Schussen) of Baden-Württemberg, tributary of the Schussen
- Mühlbach (Altmühl), of Bavaria, tributary of the Altmühl
- Mühlbach (Gleiritsch), of Bavaria, tributary of the Gleiritsch
- Mühlbach (Isar-Werkkanal), of Bavaria, tributary of the Isar
- Mühlbach (Mangfall), of Bavaria, tributary of the Mangfall
- Auer Mühlbach, of Bavaria
- Zipser Mühlbach, of Bavaria
- Maria-Einsiedel-Mühlbach, of Bavaria
- Mühlbach, a man-made canal in Dachau, Bavaria
- Mühlbach (Merkenfritzerbach), of Hesse, headstream of the Merkenfritzerbach
- Mühlbach (Schwarzbach), of Hesse, tributary of the Schwarzbach
- Mühlbach (Elbbach), of Hesse, tributary of the Elbbach

== People with the surname ==
- Luise Mühlbach (1814–1873), German writer best known for her works of historical fiction
- Don Muhlbach (born 1981), American football long snapper
