= Mühlenbach =

Mühlenbach may refer to:

- Mühlenbach, a town in Ortenau district, Baden-Württemberg, Germany
- Mühlenbach, a location in the town of Waldbröl, North Rhine-Westphalia, Germany

== Streams and rivers in Germany ==
- Mühlenbach (Eggel)
- Mühlenbach (Emmer), a river of Ostwestfalen-Lippe
- Mühlenbach (Ruhr)
- Mühlenbach (Schwalm), a tributary of the Schwalm river
- Mühlenbach (Schwarzbach)
- Mühlenbach (Werre)
- Halterner Mühlenbach

== See also ==
- Muhlenbach (disambiguation)
- Mühlebach (disambiguation)
- Mühlbach (disambiguation)
