= Müllenbach (disambiguation) =

Müllenbach is a municipality in the district of Ahrweiler, in Rhineland-Palatinate, Germany.

Müllenbach, Muellenbach or Mullenbach may also refer to:

- Müllenbach, Cochem-Zell, municipality belonging to a Verbandsgemeinde, a kind of collective municipality, in the Cochem-Zell district in Rhineland-Palatinate, Germany

== People with the name ==
- Alexander Mullenbach (born 1949), Luxembourg pianist, composer and conductor

== See also ==
- Mühlenbach (disambiguation)
