= Gleiritsch (river) =

River in Bavaria, Germany

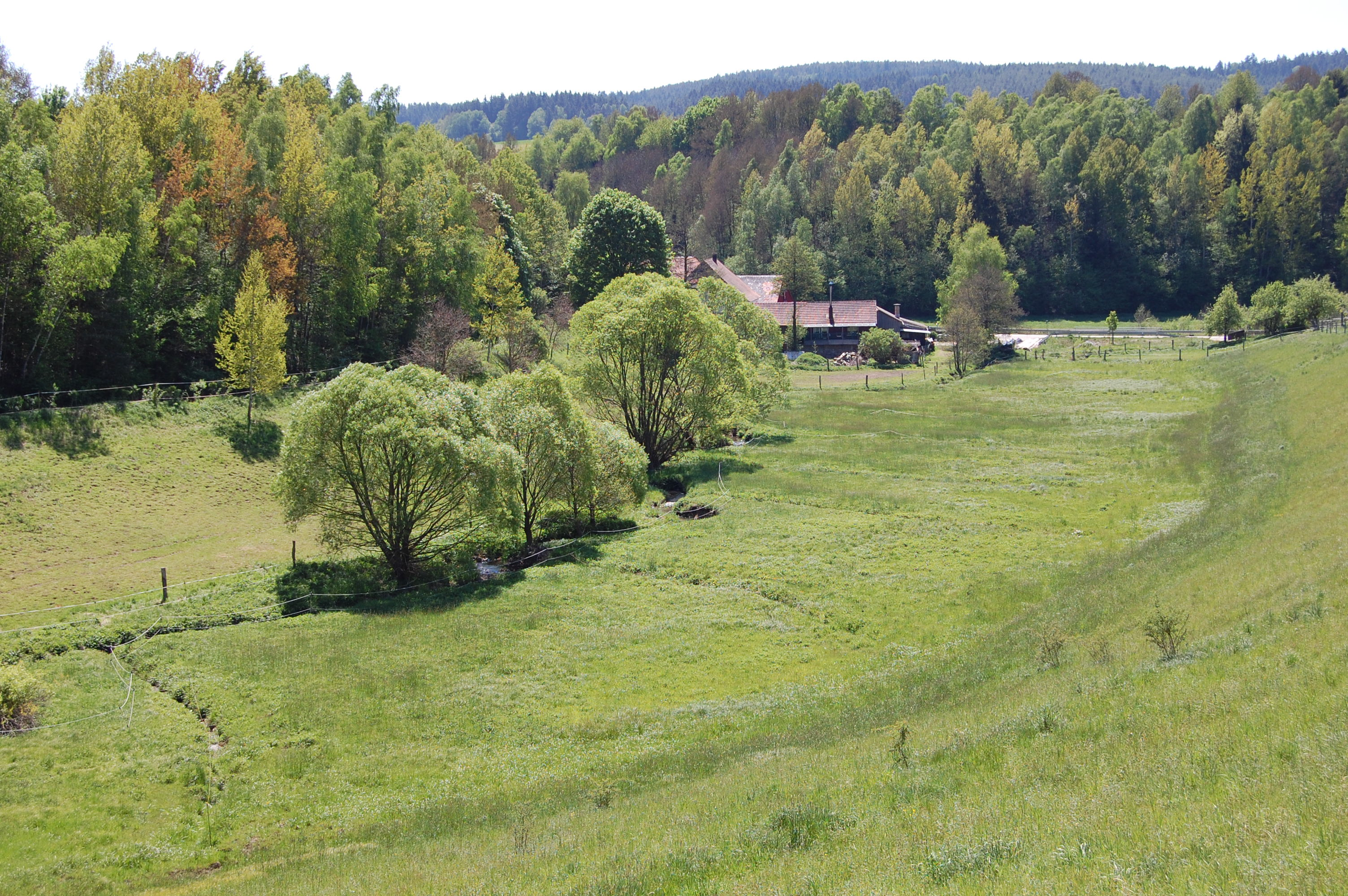
- The Gleiritsch at the Kohlmühle of the municipality Gleiritsch

Location
- Country: Germany
- State: Bavaria

Physical characteristics
- Mouth
  - location: Pfreimd
  - coordinates: 49.5146°N 12.2586°E
- Length: 9.9 km (6.2 mi)

Basin features
- Progression: Pfreimd→ Naab→ Danube→ Black Sea

Gleiritsch (German pronunciation: [ˈɡlaɪʁɪtʃ]) is a river of Bavaria, Germany. It passes through the village Gleiritsch and flows into the Pfreimd near Trausnitz.

== See also ==
- List of rivers of Bavaria
