= Mühlbach (Gleiritsch) =

River in Bavaria, Germany

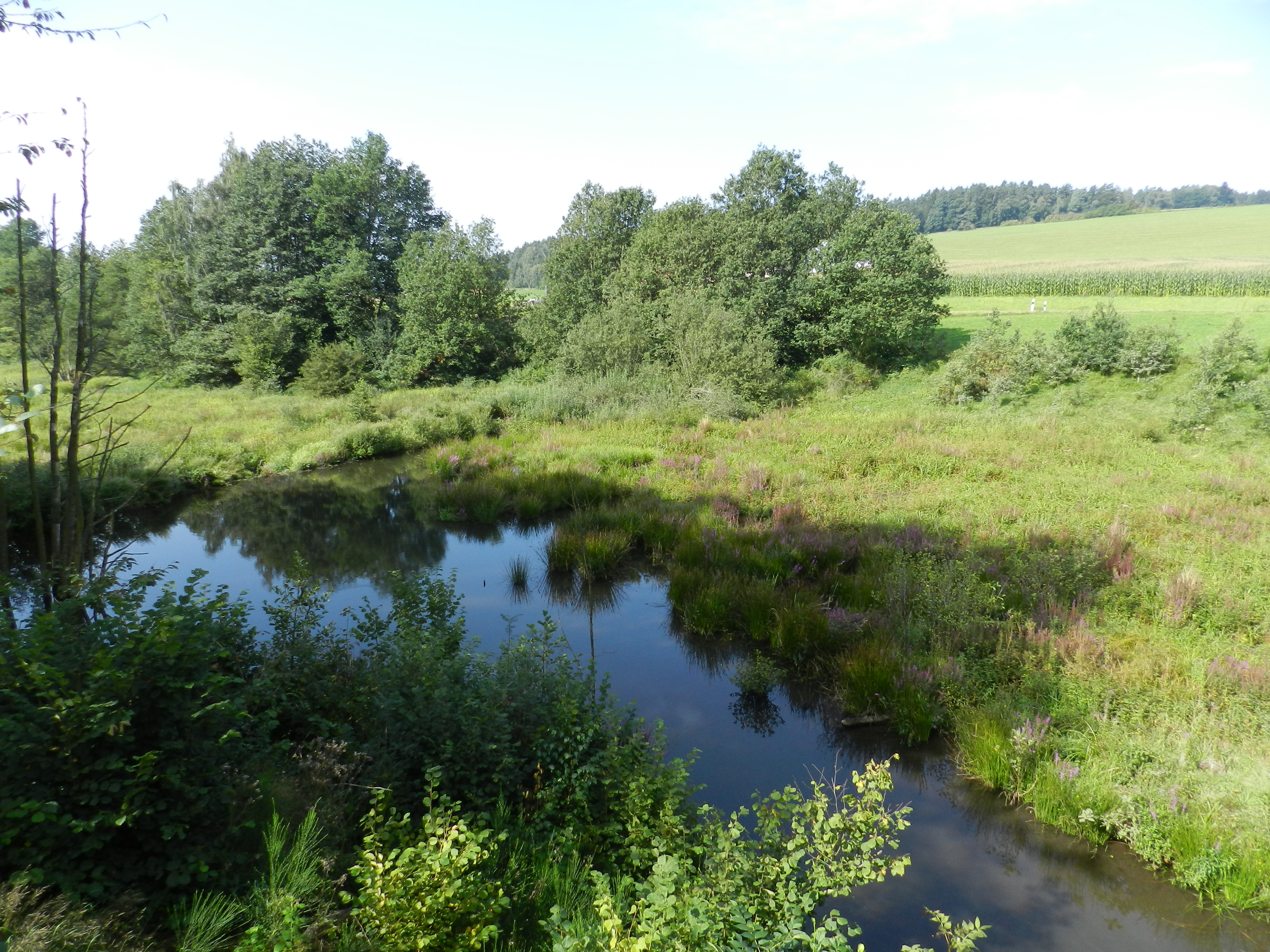
- The Mühlbach at Zieglhäuser (part of Gleiritsch)

Location
- Country: Germany
- States: Bavaria

Physical characteristics
- Mouth
  - location: Gleiritsch
  - coordinates: 49°30′23″N 12°19′15″E

Basin features
- Progression: Gleiritsch→ Pfreimd→ Naab→ Danube→ Black Sea

Mühlbach is a small river of Bavaria, Germany. It is a right tributary of the Gleiritsch in Lampenricht.

== See also ==
- List of rivers of Bavaria
