= Spertental =

Valley in Austria

Coordinates: 47°24′47″N 12°18′35″E

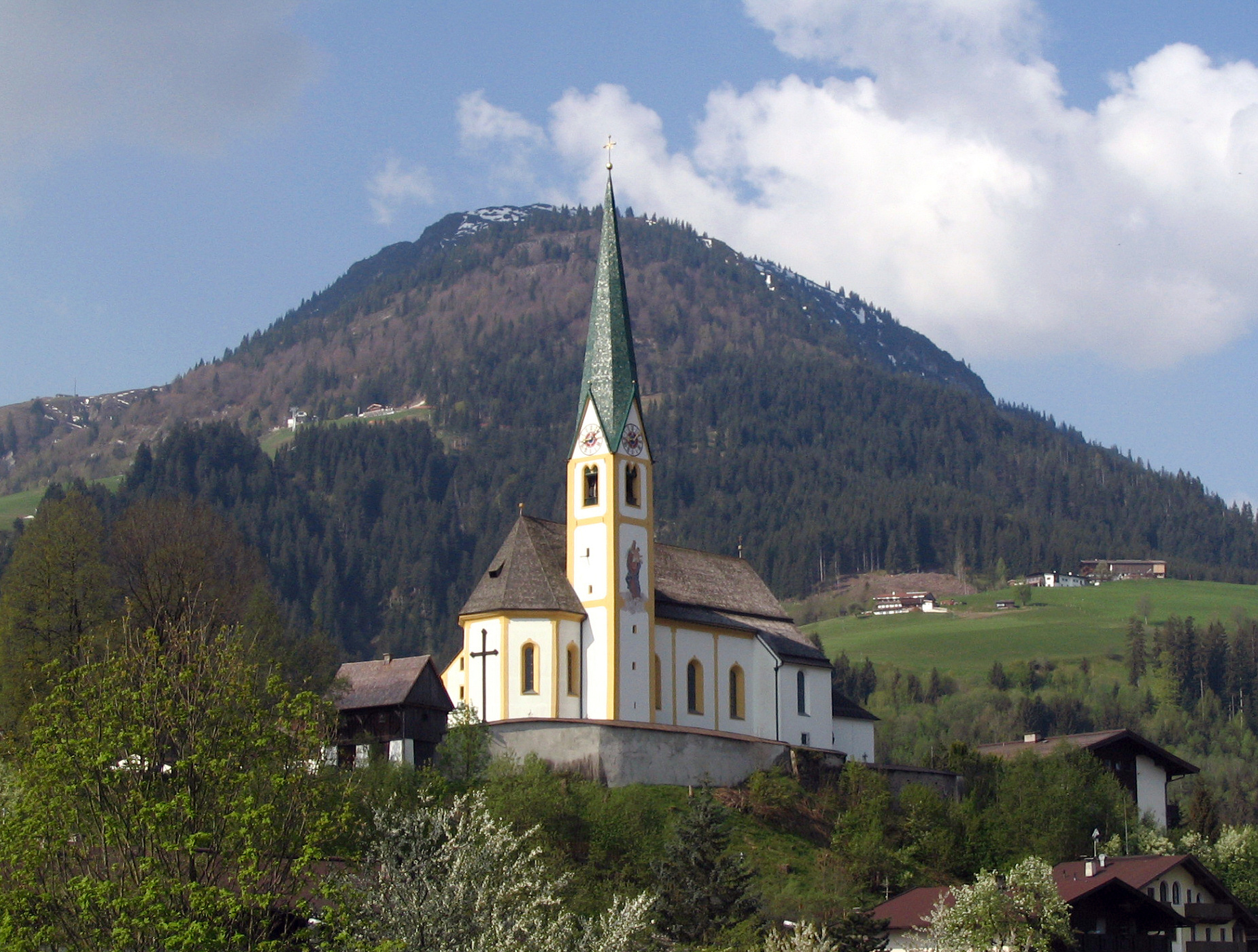
Kirchberg in Tirol in the Spertental in Tyrol, Austria

The Spertental is a southern side valley of the Brixental located in Tyrol, Austria. The valley, which is 8 km in length, unites with the Brixental near Kirchberg in Tirol (837 m).

The Aschauer Ache flows through Spertental. The landscape is surrounded by great, smooth mountains. The highest summits, the Großer Rettenstein and (2,366 m) and Kleiner Rettenstein (2,216 m), as well as smaller peaks, form a protective wall around the valley.

The Aschauer Ache rises at the foot of the Großer Rettenstein and then flows to Kirchberg, continuing to Reith bei Kitzbühel before discharging into the Kitzbühler Ache near St. Johann in Tirol.

The main settlement in the valley is Aschau im Spertental. The little village has around 100 inhabitants. The hamlet has its own parish church, the Holy Cross of Christ (Heiliger Kreuz Christi), its own school and a community hall. It also has its own band.

Near Aschau the Spertental branches into the Oberengrund and Unterengrund; beyond these bottleneck valley is the Pinzgau region.
