= Großer Rettenstein =

Mountain in Kitzbühel Alps, Austria

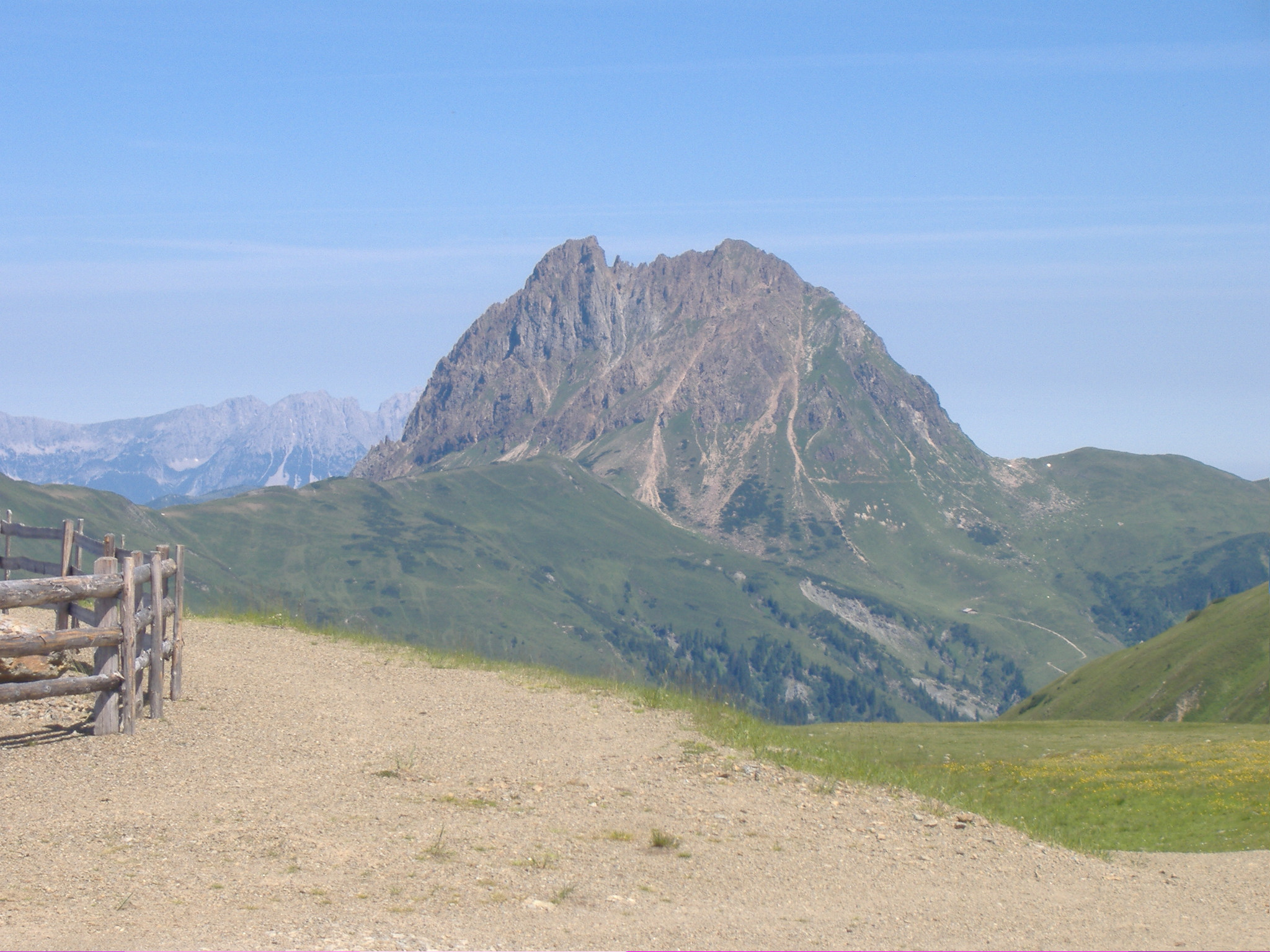
- Großer Rettenstein mit Blick aus Neukirchen

Highest point
- Elevation: 2,362 m (AA) (7,749 ft)
- Coordinates: 47°19′00″N 12°17′00″E

Geography
- Location within Austria
- Location: Tyrol / Salzburg border, Austria
- Parent range: Kitzbühel Alps

The Großer Rettenstein is a mountain with multiple peaks in the Kitzbühel Alps in Austria. The main summit reaches a height of 2,362 m (AA) Although not the highest mountain in the Kitzbühel Alps (that honour goes to the Kreuzjoch at 2,558 m above sea level (AA)), the Großer Rettenstein is the most striking in this range of otherwise gentle grass-covered mountains. It also has a mighty, craggy, summit block made of limestone, four hundred metres high, that stands atop base of grauwacke and primary rock (Urgestein - quartz phyllite). The Rettenstein is the dominating peak of the Spertental valley. Its isolated location also makes the summit an outstanding viewing point and it is therefore a popular destination. To the north the Rettenstein sends a long ridge out to the Spiessnägel, that separates the oberer Grund and unterer Grund.

== Nature ==
The Rettenstein lies in the Spertental-Rettenstein protected landscape and so Pine, Spruce, Gentian, Willow Gentian, Platenigl, Edelweiss, Monkshood, Rock Ptarmigan, Black Grouse and Capercaillie, Red Deer, Chamois, Ibex and Marmot all occur here.

== Tour options ==
The simplest ascent starts from Aschau in the Sperten valley and crosses the unterer Grund and the Schöntalalm in 3 to 4 hours. Sure-footedness is required for this route. As a variation on the descent, fit hikers can take the long ridgeway over the Spiessnägel.

Another approach option is possible from the Mühlbach valley (Bramberg municipality) in the upper Pinzgau to the south. Here the way runs initially along a drivable forest track (close to the public) through the Baumgartenalm almost as far as the Stangenjoch.

== Gallery ==
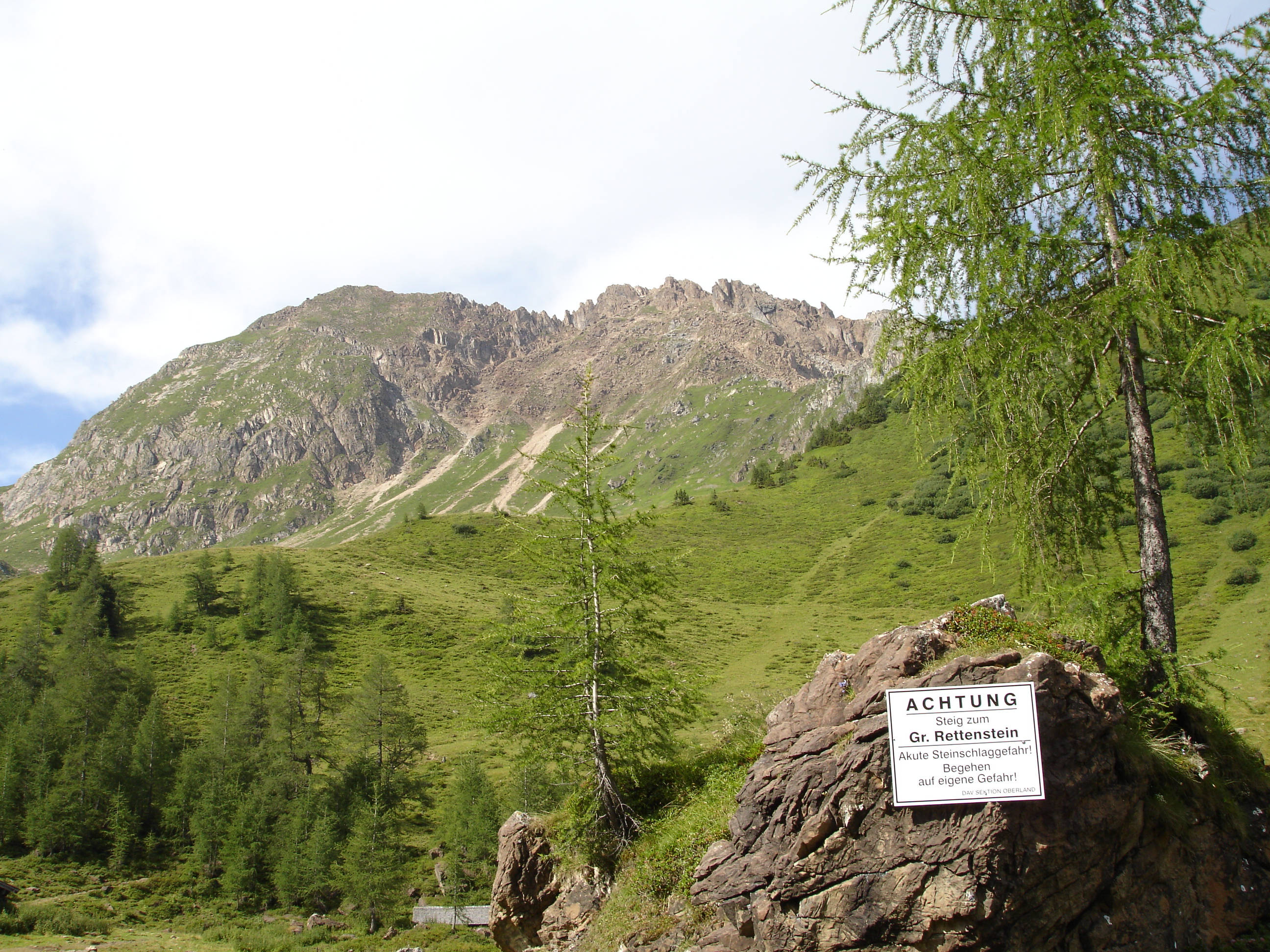
View of the NE flank of the Großer Rettenstein. The summit is in the centre of the 3 rock pinaccles.

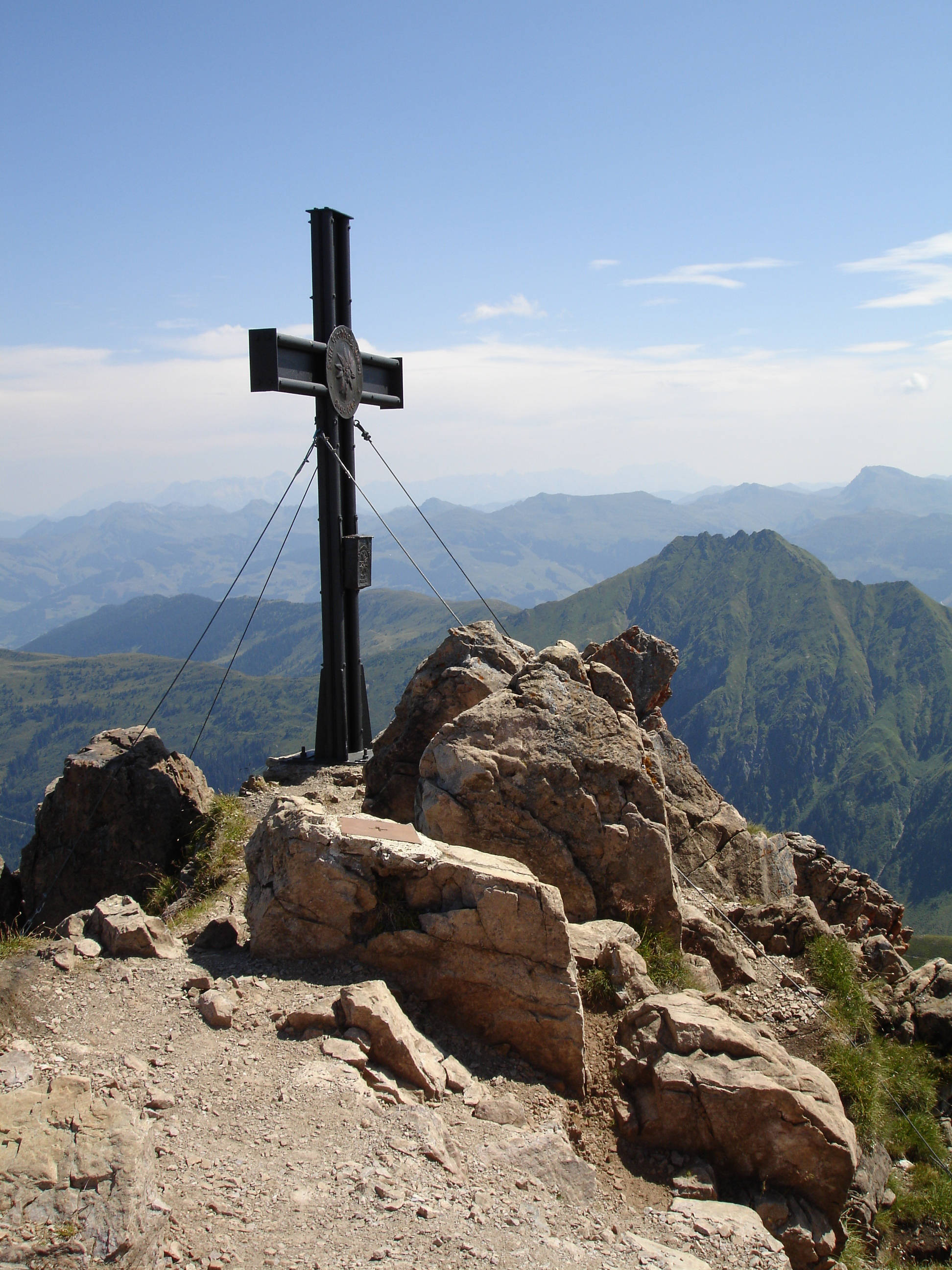
Summit cross on Großer Rettenstein. Behind: Kleiner Rettenstein.

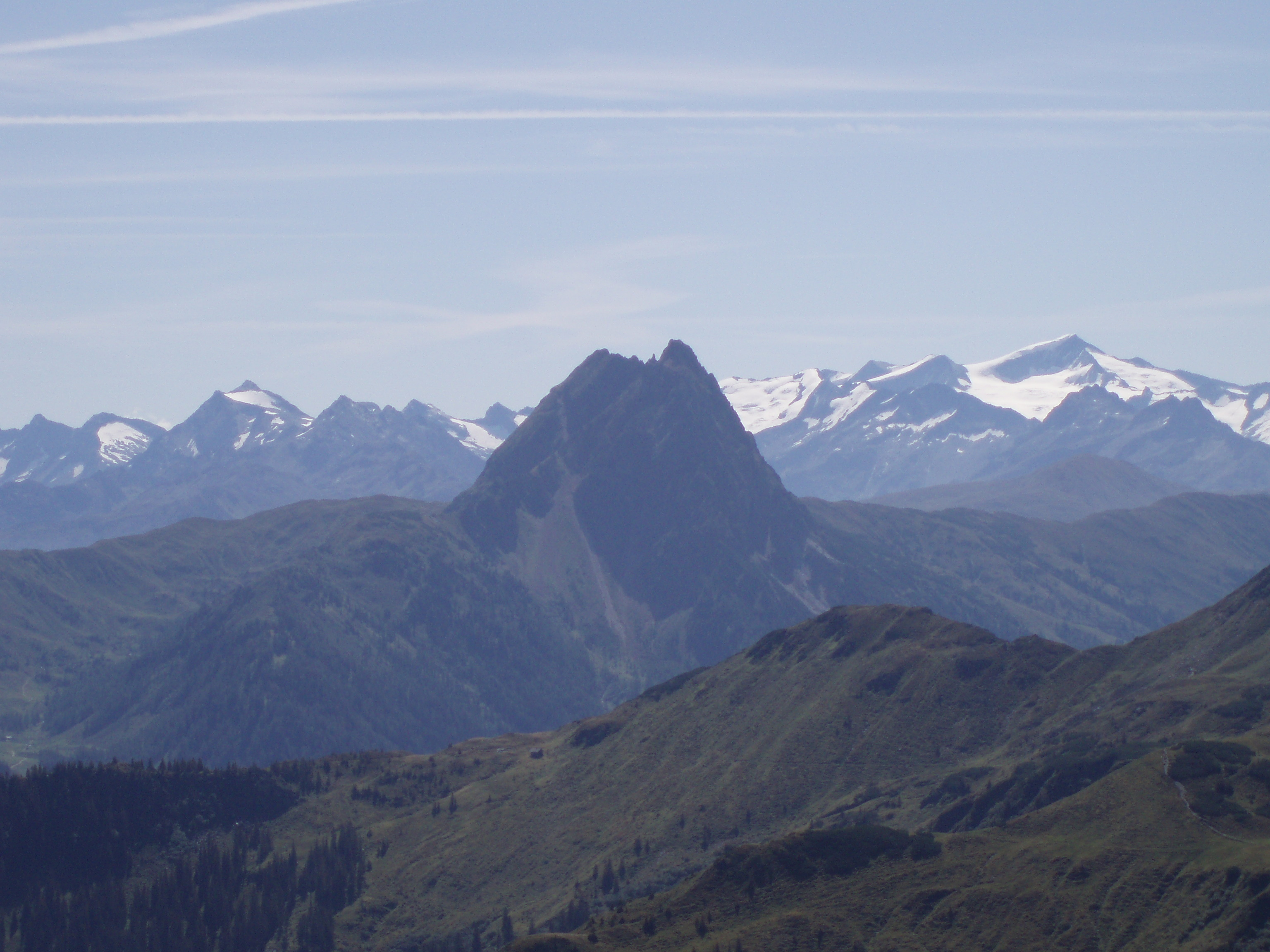
View from Gampenkogel of the mighty summit block of the Großer Rettenstein. Background: High Tauern and Großvenediger.

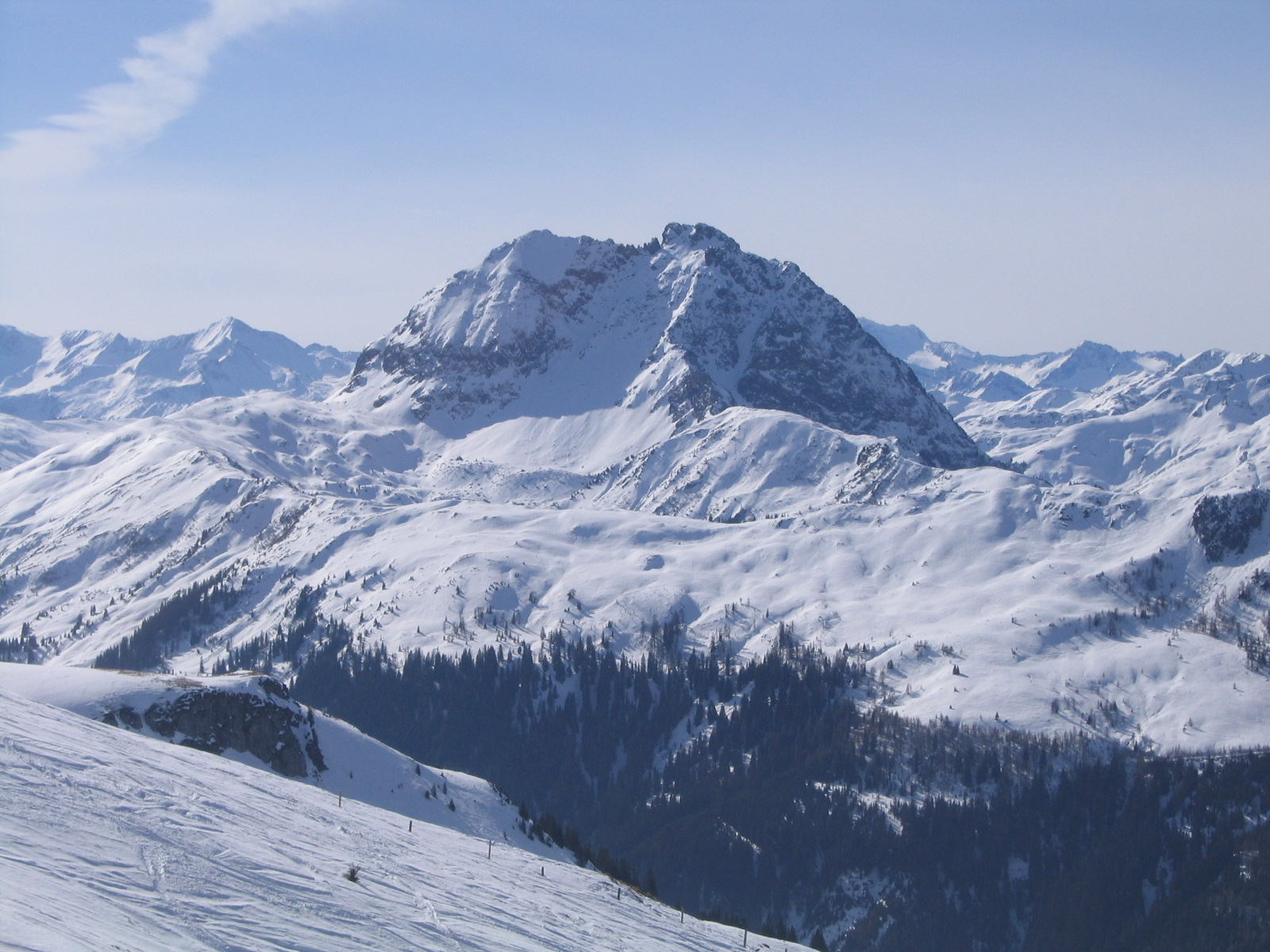
View of the Großer Rettenstein from the Pengelstein in winter.
