= Leienkaul =

- Municipality
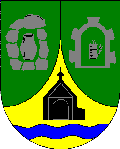
- Coat of arms

- Location of Leienkaul within Cochem-Zell district
- Interactive map of Leienkaul
- Location within Germany Location within Rhineland-Palatinate
- Coordinates: 50°13′9″N 7°5′6″E
- Country: Germany
- State: Rhineland-Palatinate
- District: Cochem-Zell
- Municipal assoc.: Kaisersesch

Government
  - Mayor (2019–24): Burkhard Klinkner

Area
  - Total: 3.25 km^{2} (1.25 sq mi)
- Elevation: 500 m (1,600 ft)

Population (2025-12-31)
  - Total: 368
  - Density: 113/km^{2} (293/sq mi)
- Time zone: UTC+01:00 (CET)
  - Summer (DST): UTC+02:00 (CEST)
- Postal codes: 56759
- Dialling codes: 02653
- Vehicle registration: COC
- Website: www.leienkaul.de

Leienkaul is an Ortsgemeinde – a municipality belonging to a Verbandsgemeinde, a kind of collective municipality – in the Cochem-Zell district in Rhineland-Palatinate, Germany. It belongs to the Verbandsgemeinde of Kaisersesch, whose seat is in the like-named town.

== Geography ==
The municipality lies in the Eifel just southeast of Laubach. Leienkaul's elevation is 500 m above sea level.

== History ==
Although the Maria Martental Monastery in the municipality is believed to have been founded about 1141 by the Springiersbach Monastery, soon thereafter becoming an important pilgrimage site, Leienkaul is quite a new settlement as places in this part of Germany go. It was founded only in the late 18th century by slate miners and their families who wanted to live near the pits where they earned their livelihood. These were found on the east side of the Kaulenbach (brook) and in the upper reaches of the Sesterbach within neighbouring Laubach's municipal limits. The new village's name was drawn from one used for a rural cadastral area, Auf den Leyenkaeulen, which comes from the early Germanic word Lei (also spelt Lay or Lai), meaning "stone" or "crag" and the dialectal word Kaul for "mine" or "pit".

Work in the pits was for those living in the nearby villages the main source of income. Soil conditions in Müllenbach and Laubach were particularly bad for crop raising and livestock raising. Stony and even craggy land with little deep soil made for very hard work and scant harvests, which could not feed local families, which tended to be big. Agriculture thus became quite secondary and was considered mainly women's and young children's work. The men and older boys, meanwhile, worked twelve-hour shifts, six days a week, in the slate pits, and after each shift, they went to work in the fields as well. The state of the population's general health at that time was beyond desolate. Medical help was very uncommon through all this poverty and extraordinarily hard and dangerous work, leading to a life expectancy among adults of roughly 50 to 60 years and an infant mortality rate of 40% right up to the age of five. Many young people also died of tuberculosis.

So went life here when the first slate miner built himself a house near the "Colonia" pit on the Kaulenbach. Many others followed his example: men from Müllenbach, Laubach and other nearby villages, and miners from the Moselle valley and the Hunsrück who moved to the Eifel. Eventually, even Belgian migrants came from the Ardennes and there were also French newcomers who had fled their homeland to escape the Revolution. Their descendants can still be recognized by their now Germanized French surnames, among which are Buschwa, Allar, Gorges, Lefev, Gilles and Regnier.

The first open slate pits were on the Sesterbach. Later, mining began to thrust its way into the mountain in the Sesterbach valley, the Endertbach valley and at the Kaulenberg Stollen (Stollen here meaning “gallery”, such as is found in a mine, not the commonly understood meaning in English). Some of the pits were in private ownership, although often 100 or more persons from one family were shareholders, which made for lasting poverty not only among the workers but sometimes even among the business owners. Wages for this extremely hard work were quite low, and owners' profits from these enterprises were only slight owing to high transport costs; slates were hauled by horse as far as Klotten, where they were loaded onto boats on the Moselle. Smaller operations had to be given up and these were bought up by stone dealers from Klotten and Cochem. By about 1900, there were only three major slate mining businesses left, namely "Maria Schacht", "Colonia Schacht" and "Müllenbacher Dachschieferwerk (Härewiss)" (Schacht means "shaft" or "pit", and Dachschieferwerk means "roof slate works").

By 1898, the Eifel Railway from Mayen to Gerolstein had been running for three years and the workload at the slate pits in Leienkaul became a bit lighter. "Maria Schacht" and “Colonia Schacht” now transported their slates with machine power. “Colonia” laid a tramway to Müllenbach on which slates were transported in small, horse-drawn trams. "Maria Schacht" built a tramway of its own in 1907 and 1908 leading to the railway tracks at the Masburger Wald (forest) and running behind the "Wolfsburg". At the same time, the "Müllenbacher Dachschieferwerk" built a railway powered by a diesel engine, which transported slates out of the Kaulenbach valley and up the steep Kaulenberg.

In 1922, the "Maria Schacht" pit complex was sold for 1.5 million Marks to the Brothers Rother. In 1928, "Colonia" and "Härewiss" were shut down. Many young people left Leienkaul to seek jobs elsewhere.

Since 1946, Leienkaul has been part of the then newly founded state of Rhineland-Palatinate.

On the night of 8 to 9 January 1959, nature put an end to all slate mining in Leienkaul. Meltwater from snow breached the three pits of the one mining operation that had remained open, "Maria Schacht", and within one night flooded the whole operation, destroying tools, machines and explosives. The flood was too much even for the pumps that had been installed to keep the pits free of water. This catastrophe threw all the Koulemänner ("pitmen") out of work, and they had to seek jobs elsewhere.

The abrupt end to the slate-mining era only kept Leienkaulers down for a short while. It was not long before the former miners found new work with the Bundeswehr, which in the early 1960s sought more personnel for its bases at Büchel and Ulmen. Others found jobs in the service sector.

Until 12 June 2004, Leienkaul was a constituent community of Laubach, but on that day, it became a separate municipality, and now has its own mayor and municipal council.

== Politics ==
=== Municipal council ===
The council is made up of 8 council members, who were elected at the municipal election held on 7 June 2009, and the honorary mayor as chairman.

=== Mayor ===
Leienkaul's mayor is Burkhard Klinkner, and his deputies are Bruno Ferdinand and Helmut Welter.

== Culture and sightseeing ==
=== Buildings ===
The following are listed buildings or sites in Rhineland-Palatinate’s Directory of Cultural Monuments:

- Maria Martental Monastery (monumental zone) – founded in 1141, in ruins by 1678, newly built in 1681, possibly with a chapel, in 1791 converted to a secular knightly foundation, destroyed in 1794; in 1934 from the predecessor of today’s pilgrimage church, a rectangular aisleless church with a ridge turret, architects Max Melsheimer, Darmstadt, and Anton Falkowski, Mainz, portal, marked 1737, porch 1968-1974, décor; behind the church: in the substructural walls new stone, marked 1562; bronze image of Mary with a halo; Way of the Cross, 20th century; cross on the old Nuns’ Chapel; wayside chapel, 1930s; so-called Napoleonsbrücke (“Napoleon’s Bridge”), marked 1725, widened in 1938; commercial building with half-hipped roof, 18th century, Baroque coat of arms; graveyard
- Slate heap, Grubenstraße (monumental zone) – tailing heap
- On Kreisstraße 14, going towards Breitenbruch – water cistern; rusticated-block cube, marked 1915
- On Kreisstraße 14, going towards Breitenbruch – basalt wayside cross, 17th century (?)
- Siedlung am Meilenstein (“Settlement at the Milestone”) – milestone; basalt obelisk, marked 1834
