= Muhlenbach =

Muhlenbach may refer to:

- Muhlenbach, Luxembourg, a quarter in north-western Luxembourg City

== See also ==
- Mühlenbach (disambiguation)
