= Pfreimd (Verwaltungsgemeinschaft) =

- Verwaltungsgemeinschaft
- Location of Pfreimd within Schwandorf district
- Interactive map of Pfreimd
- Location within Germany Location within Bavaria
- Coordinates: 49°30′N 12°11′E
- Country: Germany
- State: Bavaria
- Admin. region: Upper Palatinate
- District: Schwandorf
- Seat: Pfreimd
- Subdivisions: 2 municipalities

Area
  - Total: 69.11 km^{2} (26.68 sq mi)

Population (2025-12-31)
  - Total: 5,848
  - Density: 84.62/km^{2} (219.2/sq mi)
- Time zone: UTC+01:00 (CET)
  - Summer (DST): UTC+02:00 (CEST)
- Website: vg.pfreimd.de

Pfreimd is a Verwaltungsgemeinschaft (municipal association) in the district of Schwandorf in Bavaria, Germany. Its seat is in Pfreimd.

It consists of the following municipalities:

1. Pfreimd
2. Trausnitz
