= Maria-Einsiedel-Mühlbach =

River in Bavaria, Germany

Location
- Country: Germany
- States: Bavaria

Physical characteristics
- Source
  - location: 48.0946°N 11.5461°E
- Mouth
  - location: 48.1016°N 11.5485°E

Maria-Einsiedel-Mühlbach (also Mühlbach) is a river of Bavaria, Germany. It is a branch of the Maria-Einsiedel-Bach in Munich.

== See also ==
- List of rivers of Bavaria
