= Mühlbach im Pinzgau =

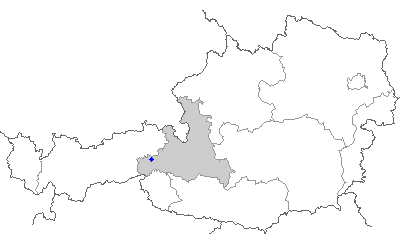
Map
Base data
State:	Salzburg Land
Administrative district:	Zell am See (Pinzgau) (ZE)
Parish:	Bramberg am Wildkogel
Elevation:	819 m (AA)
Post code:	5732
Location:	47°16′44.7″N 12°22′34.111″E
Head office:	Gemeindeamt Bramberg am Wildkogel; Dorfstraße 100; 5733 Bramberg am Wildkogel
Official website:	www.bramberg.at

Mühlbach im Pinzgau is a village and a cadastral parish (Katastralgemeinde) within the municipality of Bramberg am Wildkogel. The village lies within Zell am See District in the western part of the Austrian state of Salzburg.

== Geography ==
The cadastral community lies in the Upper Pinzgau at the southern foot of the 2,225 m high Wildkogel in the municipality of Bramberg and west of the municipality of Hollersbach im Pinzgau. A stream of the same name flows through Mühlbach and it is one of the few tributaries in the Upper Pinzgau that empties into the Salzach river from the north. Its valley runs from the village of Mühlbach upstream in a curve, first in a northerly direction and then swings westwards behind the Wildkogel.

== History ==
In ancient times the region was a mining centre for copper ore and Mühlbach im Pinzgau was the seat of a mining commission (Berghauptmannschaft). Mining in Mühlbach was first mentioned in 1425 in the records and was in the possession of the Mannlich family from Augsburg in Bavaria until the mines were sold to the archbishop of Salzburg in 1638. In 1863 the mines were closed and subsequent attempts to reopen them failed. Nevertheless there are still numerous house and farm names that recall past mining functions, for example: Knappenstubn, Öfner, Grubenhüter, Schmirber, Verwalter, Handelsschmied and more besides. Worth a visit is the building in which the former imperial and royal forestry commission was housed. Today, this building is the home of "Bramberg Mining Research" (Bergbauforschung Bramberg), a club that is concerned with the history of mining and, in particular, research into mining in the Upper Pinzgau.

== Transport ==
The main road to the village is the B 165 federal highway.

Local public transport services that stop in Mühlbach include buses of the Salzburger Verkehrsverbund and Austrian Postbus companies running between Krimml and Zell am See, as well as the Pinzgauer Lokalbahn, which enables connexions to the Austrian main line network in Zell am See.

== Sport and leisure ==
The municipality of Bramberg, with just under 4,000 inhabitants, manages to field two football clubs, TSU Bramberg and SC Mühlbach. Both teams play in the 2nd Landesliga South which is the second highest league in the state of Salzburg. There is also a public open-air swimming pool in Mühlbach and various winter sports facilities. In addition the village lies on the Tauern Cycleway, an Austrian long-distance cycle path.
