= Pfreimd (river) =

River in Germany

Pfreimd Katharinabach
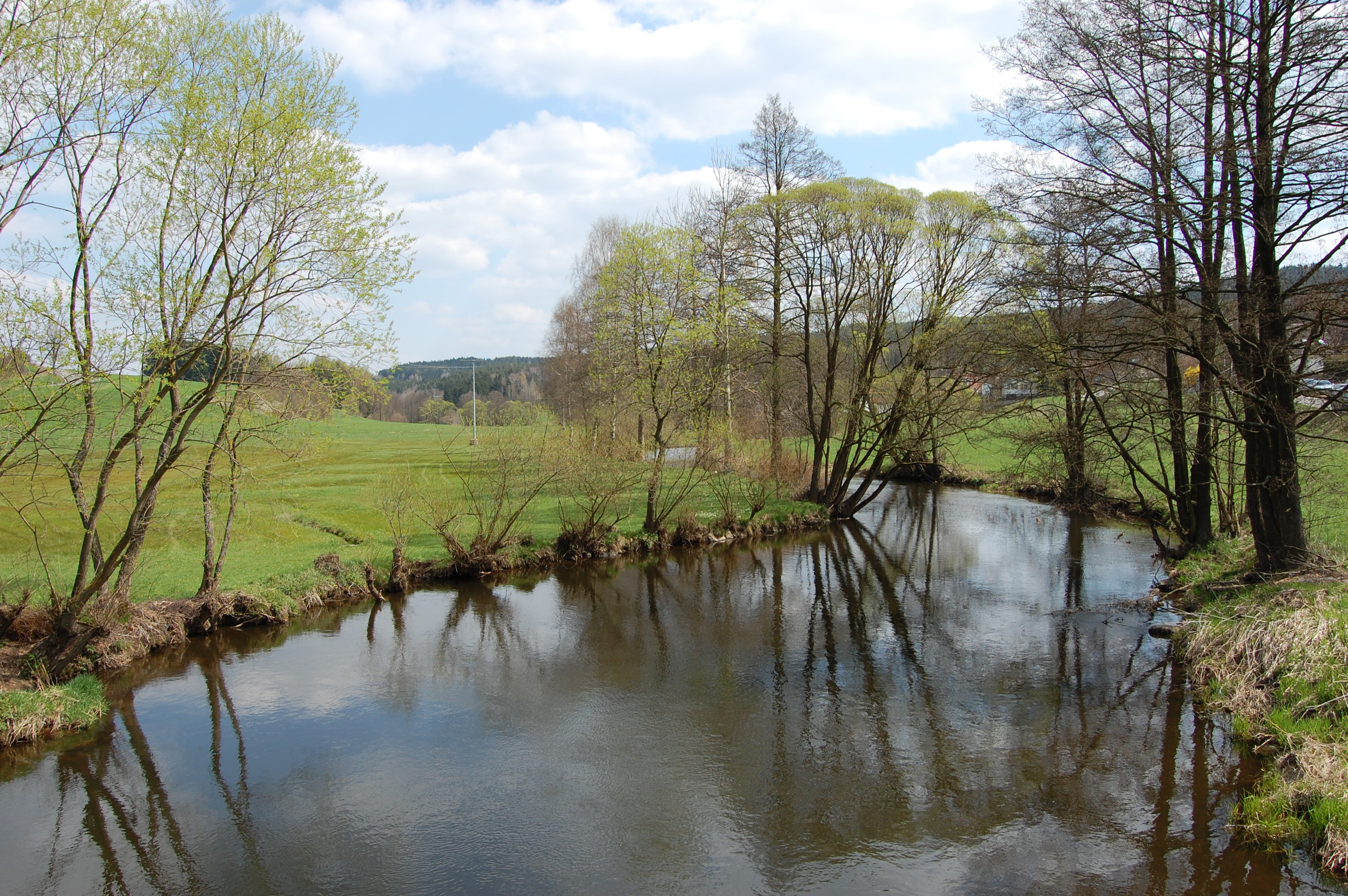
- The Pfreimd at Böhmischbruck, neighborhood of Vohenstrauß
- Native name: Kateřinský potok (Czech)

Location
- Countries: Germany; Czech Republic
- State (DE): Bavaria
- Region (CZ): Plzeň

Physical characteristics
- Mouth
  - location: Naab
  - coordinates: 49.4991°N 12.1772°E
- Length: 76.5 km (47.5 mi)
- Basin size: 595 km^{2} (230 sq mi)

Basin features
- Progression: Naab→ Danube→ Black Sea

Pfreimd (German pronunciation: [pfʁaɪmt]; in its upper course: Katharinabach; Czech: Kateřinský potok) is a river of Plzeň Region, Czech Republic and Bavaria, Germany. It flows into the Naab in the town Pfreimd.

== See also ==
- List of rivers of Bavaria
