= Bramberg am Wildkogel =

- Municipality
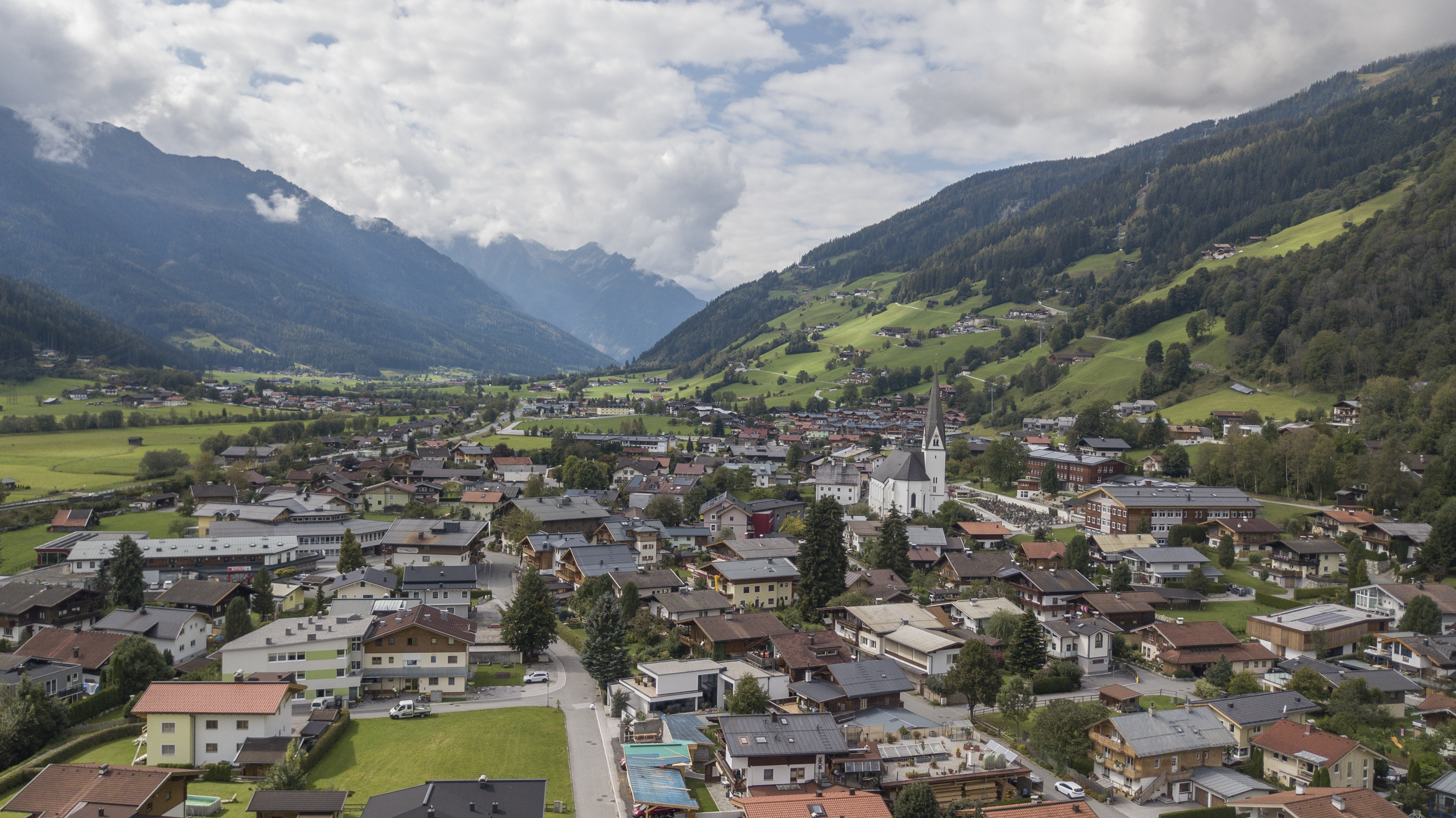

- Coat of arms

- Location within Austria
- Coordinates: 47°16′22″N 12°20′53″E
- Country: Austria
- State: Salzburg
- District: Zell am See

Government
  - Mayor: Hannes Enzinger (ÖVP)

Area
  - Total: 117.2 km^{2} (45.3 sq mi)
- Elevation: 819 m (2,687 ft)

Population (2018-01-01)
  - Total: 3,936
  - Density: 33.58/km^{2} (86.98/sq mi)
- Time zone: UTC+1 (CET)
  - Summer (DST): UTC+2 (CEST)
- Postal code: 5733
- Area code: 06566
- Vehicle registration: ZE
- Website: www.bramberg.salzburg.at

Bramberg am Wildkogel is a municipality in the district of Zell am See (Pinzgau region), in the state of Salzburg, Austria. The town lies at the south foot of the 2,225-metre (7,300 ft) high Wildkogel mountain. The town's average elevation is 819 metres (2,687 ft).

== History ==
In ancient times, the area around Bramberg was a copper-ore mining center. Belonging to the municipality Leitengut, Bramberg was mentioned in 925 as the oldest parish in the upper Salzachtal river valley and in 1160 was named as "Prentenperige" for the first time. The mining was taken up again in 1829 and finally abandoned in 1863. Attempts at mining again in the 20th century later failed.

Also the famous emerald mines in Habachtal, alongside Norway and Italy, are the only emerald mine locations in Europe.

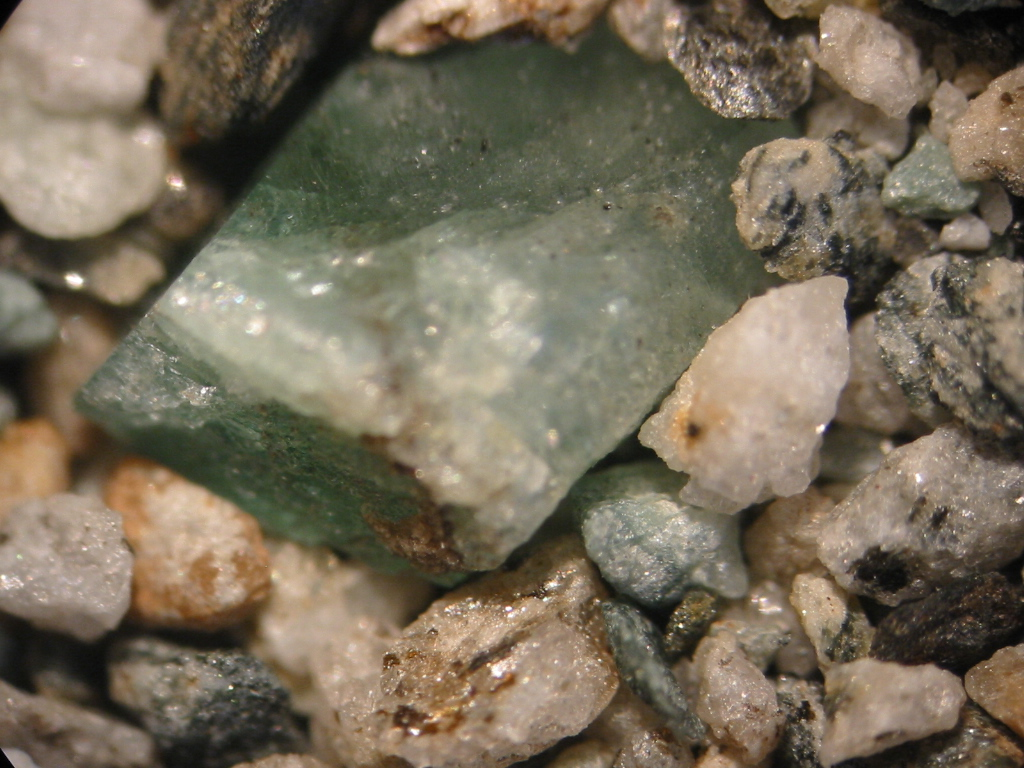
Emerald from habachtal

== Coat of arms ==
The crest shows: "In blue two towering battlements of silver, and at the sign above the left edge of offensive. From the right side of the higher pinnacle comes a golden horse. "It is a representation of the old war-horse Fjuri of the Knight Bart from Küniglberg. The horse was, in 1376, ridden after a wild night with Knight Bart in the Wildkogel area, and by a miracle, after several days and then plated back to one of the richest gold mines in the Hohe Tauern. The Knight Bart, however, was never seen again.

== Localities ==
These are the localities in the municipality:

- Bicheln
- Bramberg
- Dorf
- Habach

- Leiten
- Mühlbach
- Mühlberg

- Schönbach
- Schweinegg
- Sonnegg

- Steinach
- Wenns
- Weyer

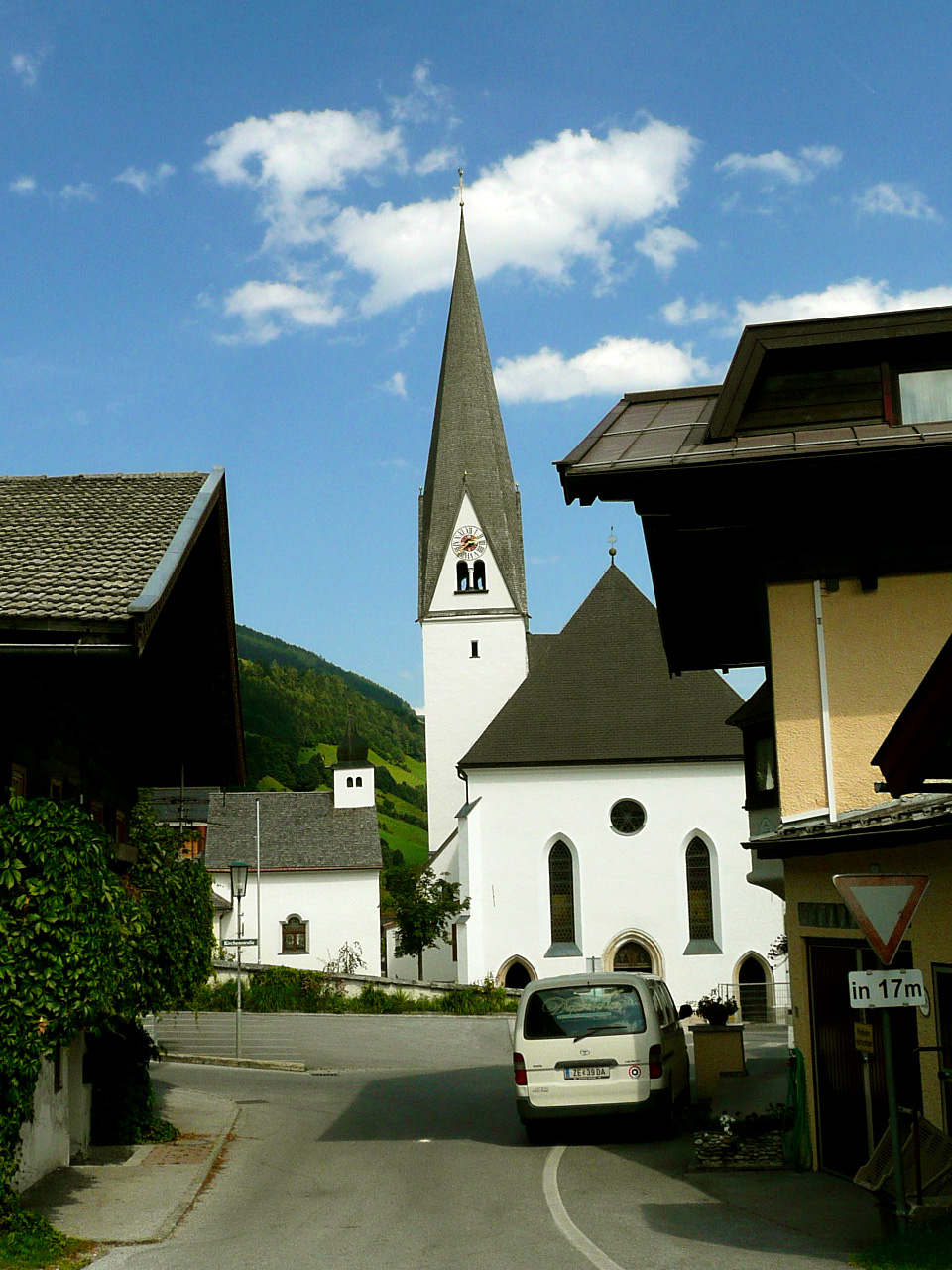
Main church

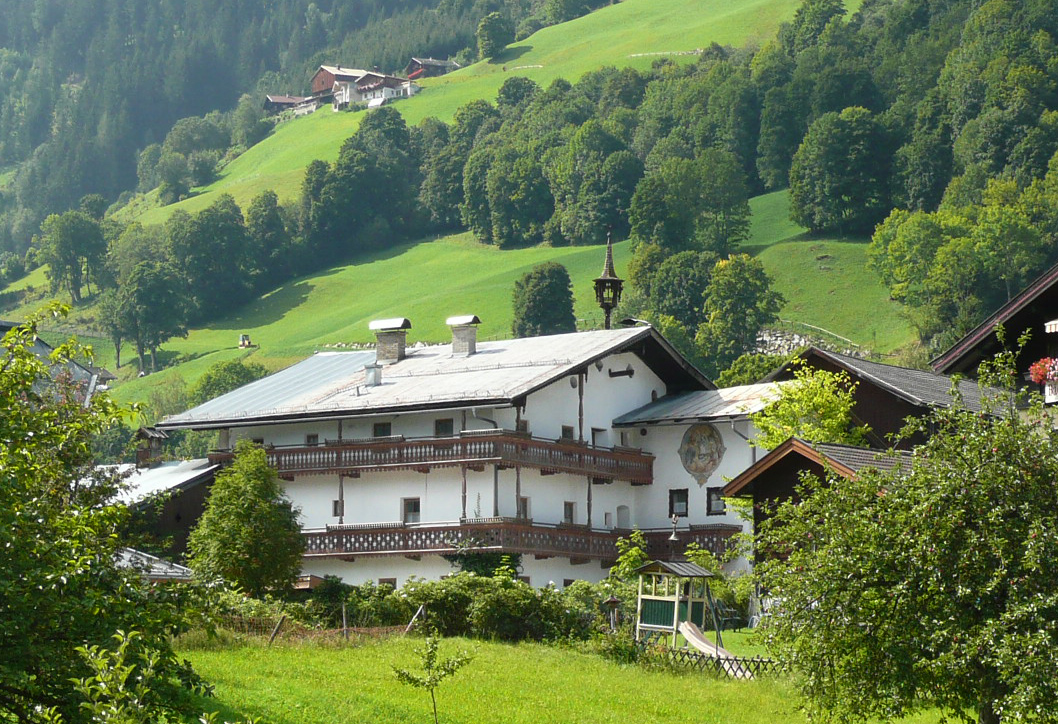
Renovated Farm in Bramberg

== Politics ==
The City Council is composed of the following parties:

- 10 ÖVP
- 9 SPÖ
- 2 BBL (Bramberger Burgerliste)

The directly elected Bürgermeister is Walter Freiberger (SPÖ).

== Transport ==
The federal road, the Bundesstraße 165, runs east–west through the municipality. Public transport is provided by bus services of the Salzburger Verkehrsverbund as well as rail services on the Pinzgauer Lokalbahn, which has a junction at Zell am See to the Austrian main line network. There are also post buses to Krimml and Zell am See.

== Culture and places of interest ==
=== Museums ===
- Local history museum

=== Sport ===
- Wildkogel ski area on the Wildkogel
- Cable car to the Wildkogel (Smaragdbahn, opened December 2010)
- Floodlit toboggan run (at 14 km one of the longest floodlit runs in the world)
- Floodlit cross-country skiing and skating runs
- Swimming pool and large children's play park
- Flying school for paragliding and hang gliding

== See also ==
- Salzburg
- Salzburgerland
