= Laubach, Cochem-Zell =

Laubach
- Municipality
- Coat of arms

- Location of Laubach within Cochem-Zell district
- Interactive map of Laubach
- Location within Germany Location within Rhineland-Palatinate
- Coordinates: 50°14′3″N 7°4′28″E
- Country: Germany
- State: Rhineland-Palatinate
- District: Cochem-Zell
- Municipal assoc.: Kaisersesch

Government
  - Mayor (2019–24): Manfred Adams

Area
  - Total: 3.58 km^{2} (1.38 sq mi)
- Elevation: 550 m (1,800 ft)

Population (2025-12-31)
  - Total: 655
  - Density: 183/km^{2} (474/sq mi)
- Time zone: UTC+01:00 (CET)
  - Summer (DST): UTC+02:00 (CEST)
- Postal codes: 56759
- Dialling codes: 02653
- Vehicle registration: COC
- Website: www.laubach-eifel.de

Laubach (German pronunciation: [ˈlaʊbax]) is an Ortsgemeinde (a municipality belonging to a Verbandsgemeinde, a collective municipality) in the Cochem-Zell district in Rhineland-Palatinate, Germany. It belongs to the Verbandsgemeinde of Kaisersesch, whose seat is Kaisersesch. Laubach is a state-recognized tourist area.

== Geography ==
The municipality lies in the Eifel, roughly 3 kilometres (1.9 mi) west of Kaisersesch, at an elevation of 550 metres (1,800 ft) above sea level. Laubach is on Autobahn A 48, between Koblenz and Trier.

== Name ==
The municipality's name probably has its roots in the Middle High German lôbach. Lob and the Modern High German Laub (a cognate of the English “leaf”) refer to a forest, while ach means a boggy stretch of ground.

== History ==
Several finds in the Laubach area provide clues about early settlers; a late Bronze Age barrow exists in the municipality, and the Romans left stone traces. The first mention of Laubach was in 1455, when “court, people and revenue at Laubach” were sold to the Counts of Virneburg (a noble family first mentioned in 1024 and enfeoffed by the Archbishop of Trier). In 1548, the Electorate of Trier assumed the lordly rights.

For centuries, the village's primary livelihood was slate mining. This is documented as far back as 1695, although smaller pits were worked before that. The last slate pit was closed in 1959, after it flooded.

Laubach belonged to the high court district of Masburg (which was owned by the Counts of Virneburg), and owed its tithes to Saint Castor's Monastery in Karden (even after the Electorate of Trier took over). Armies waged war across the land; King Louis XIV's forces overran the area during the Nine Years' War (known in Germany as the Pfälzischer Erbfolgekrieg, or War of the Palatine Succession), as did armies in the Thirty Years' War.

In 1563 Laubach had fifteen households, but in 1680 (32 years after the Thirty Years' War had ended) there were only five remaining. By 1874, there were 26 households.

Beginning in 1794, Laubach was under French rule. In 1815, it was assigned to the Kingdom of Prussia by the Congress of Vienna.

Under Napoleon, the lands on the Rhine’s left bank became French in 1798 and their administration was modeled on France. Laubach belonged to the Department of Rhin-et-Moselle (or Rhein-Mosel in German) and to the canton and mairie (mayoralty) of Kaisersesch. In 1809, there were 17 residents. The Rhineland, as part of a larger state, enjoyed advantages such as freedom of trade, equality before the law (including the Code Napoléon) and expansion of the road network.

Laubach lay on the Route de deuxième classe Paris-Trier-Koblenz. During the French Revolution, French settlers came to Laubach and the surrounding area; this is evidenced by local surnames such as Bourgeois (later Germanized to Buschwa), Gorges, Lefev, Regnier and Gilles. French words entered local speech, some of which can still be heard. When Europe was divided among the great powers at the Congress of Vienna in 1815, the Rhineland became Prussian. Prussian rule brought the impoverished Eifel region economic improvements in health care, roads, schools, churches, industry and handicrafts (although the focus was still on agriculture). By 1832 Laubach's population had risen to 270, and by 1872 to 345.

The Franco-Prussian War in 1870–71 again brought hardship to the Eifel region, followed by the First World War. Troops marched through the countryside, and the school became an army camp. Of Laubach's 224 male inhabitants in 1905, 88 served in the war. Only women and children were left to work the fields, the latter missing school.

Fifteen of the village's men fell in the Great War; in 1918 ten others were prisoners of war, and two more were missing in action. The war years were marked by crop failures, hunger and cold, and the period after the war was no better.

The 1920s brought joblessness, inflation, poverty and hunger. National Socialism does not seem to have played much of a rôle in Laubach (apart from the occasional Nazi) compared with the rest of Germany. This entry from the local schoolteacher in the school and village chronicle in 1933 says:

With the seizure of power by the Führer Adolf Hitler and the NSDAP, the whole outlook changes. One thing, nonetheless, can be expected to come along with the movement: inwardly, some are its adversaries now just as they were before. They knowingly belong to those whom the Führer “broadly renounces”.

The Second World War claimed 21 men from Laubach; on 1 September 1949, another 11 were missing in action and 8 were prisoners of war. Economic hardship again followed, eased by gathering beechnuts in the surrounding woods (as the villagers also did after the First World War). The beechnuts were delivered to a central location, and processed for their oil; four-and-a-half kilogrammes of beechnuts yielded one litre of beechnut oil. The price for a kilogramme of beechnuts was two marks, and a litre of beechnut oil cost fifteen marks.

Since 1946, Laubach has been part of the state of Rhineland-Palatinate. The outlying area of Leienkaul (formerly part of Laubach) became a separate municipality in June 2004.

== Politics ==
=== Municipal council ===
The council is made up of 12 council members (who were elected by proportional representation at the municipal election held on 7 June 2009), with the mayor as chairman. The council seats are divided between two voters’ groups. In 2004, the election was by majority vote.

=== Mayor ===
Laubach's mayor is Manfred Adams; his deputies are Bernd Kreiser and Frank Regnier.

=== Coat of arms ===
The municipality's coat of arms includes a pickaxe and a sheaf of six ears of wheat below two rows of six lozenges each.

== Culture and sightseeing ==
=== Buildings ===
The following are listed buildings or sites in Rhineland-Palatinate’s Directory of Cultural Monuments:

- Hohlweg 2 – former school; plastered building, portion with eaves at front 1842, portion with gable at front about 1900

== Transport ==
Laubach-Müllenbach train station is located at Cross Eifel Railway from Andernach via Mayen and Ulmen to Gerolstein although the section from Kaisersesch to Gerolstein right now it is out of service. Laubach is connected to the local bis network and located in the zone number 730 of the transport association Verkehrsverbund Rhein-Mosel (VRM).
