= Mühlbach (Rur) =

River in North Rhine-Westphalia, Germany

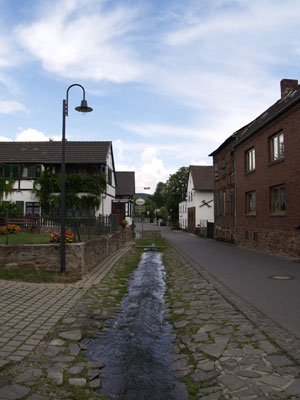

Location
- Country: Germany
- States: North Rhine-Westphalia

Physical characteristics
- Mouth
  - location: Rur
  - coordinates: 50.6709°N 6.4778°E

Basin features
- Progression: Rur→ Meuse→ North Sea

Mühlbach is a small river of North Rhine-Westphalia, Germany. It flows into the Rur in Abenden. One of the earliest references to Mühlbach dates back to 1570, when the mill above the village of Abenden is mentioned.

== See also ==
- List of rivers of North Rhine-Westphalia
