= Kleiner Rettenstein =

Mountain in Tyrol, Austria

- Location within Austria

Highest point
- Elevation: 2,216 m (AA) (7,270 ft)
- Coordinates: 47°20′13″N 12°20′30″E

Geography
- Location: Tyrol / Salzburg border, Austria
- Parent range: Kitzbühel Alps

The Kleiner Rettenstein is a 2,216-metre-high (7,270 ft) mountain in the Austrian state of Tyrol. It lies in the Kitzbühel Alps, roughly east of its larger brother, the Großer Rettenstein.

== Gallery ==
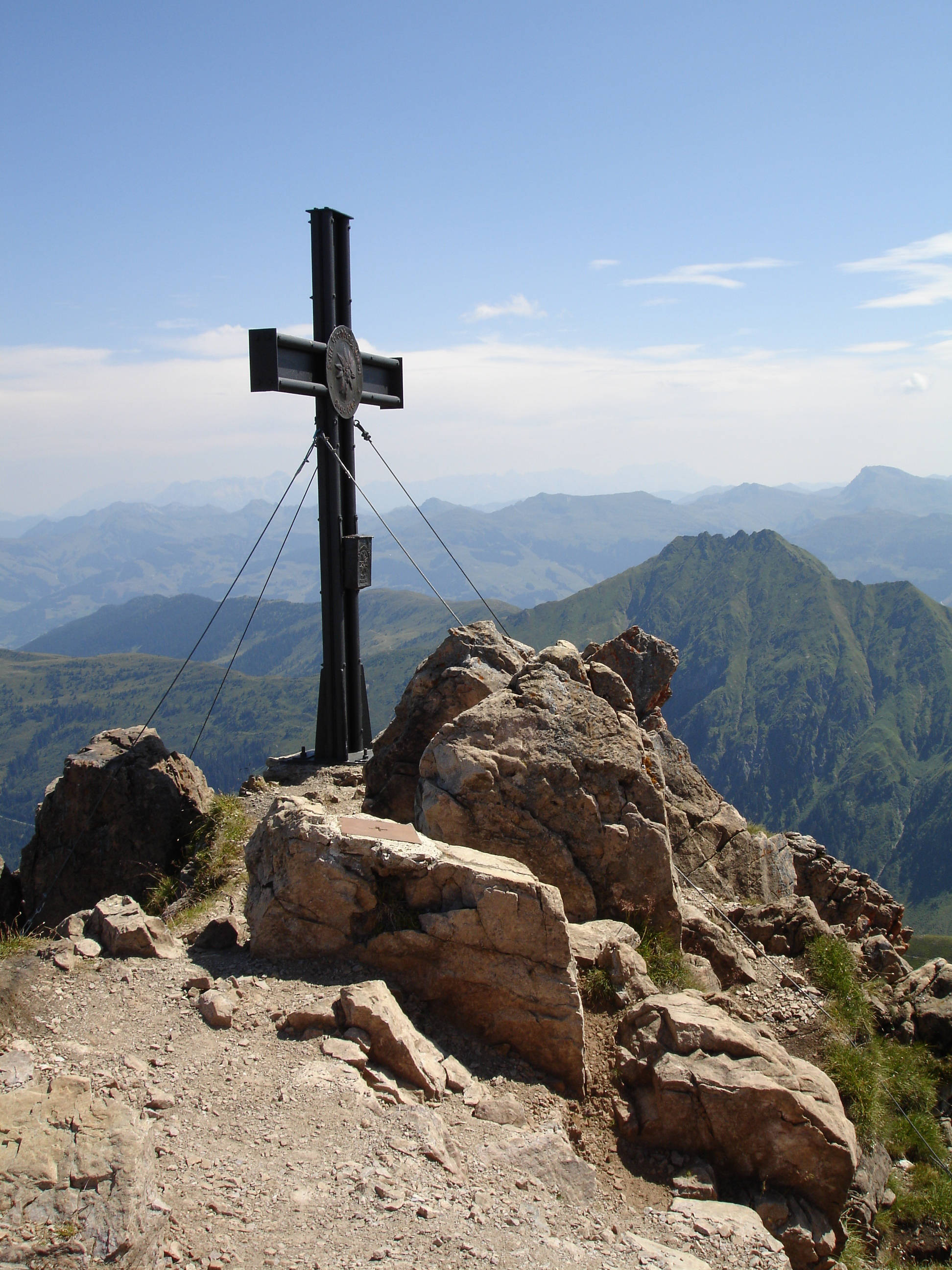
Summit cross on the Großer Rettenstein. Behind: the Kleiner Rettenstein.

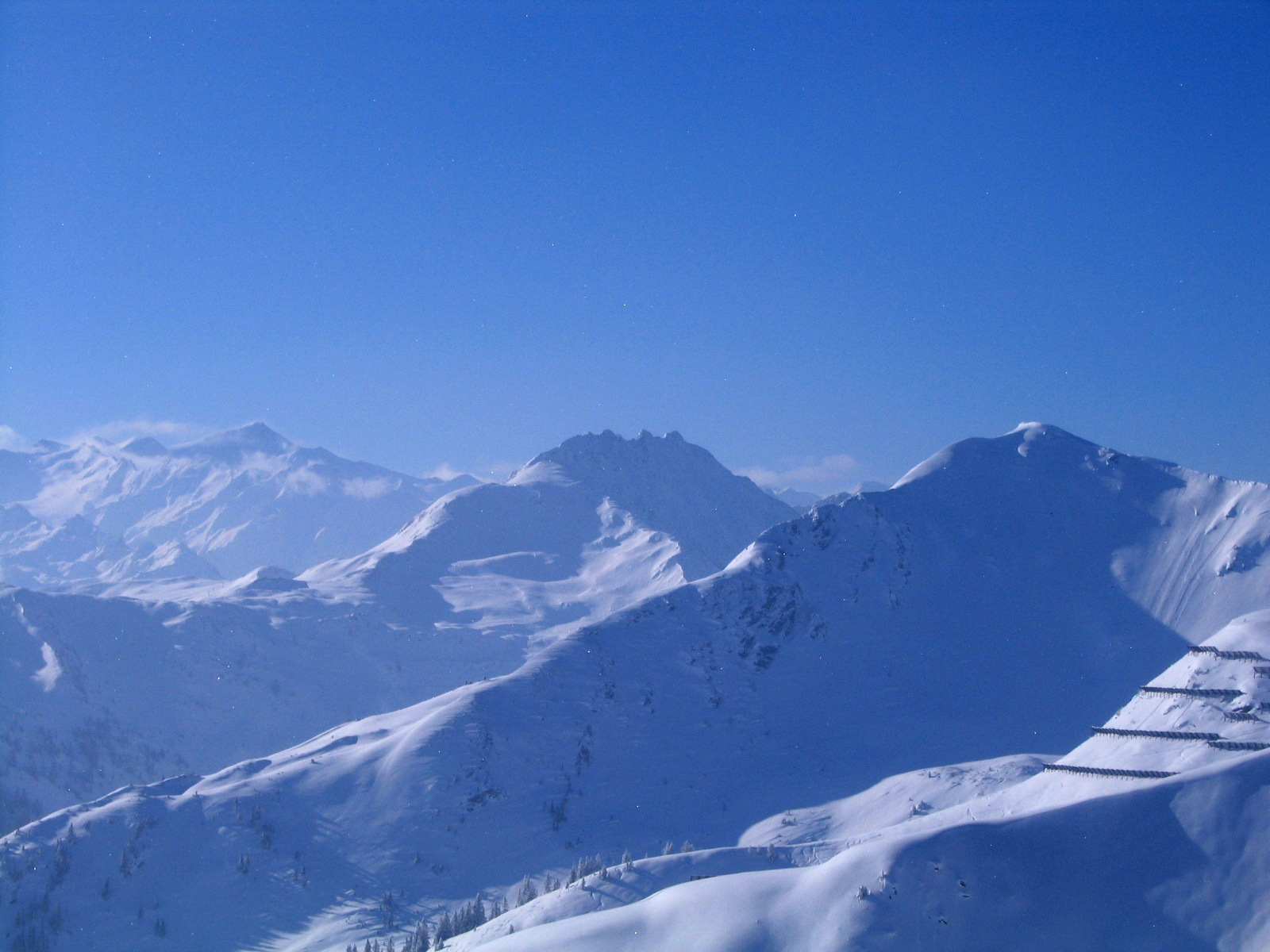
The Kleiner Rettenstein (centre) in winter from the Pengelstein

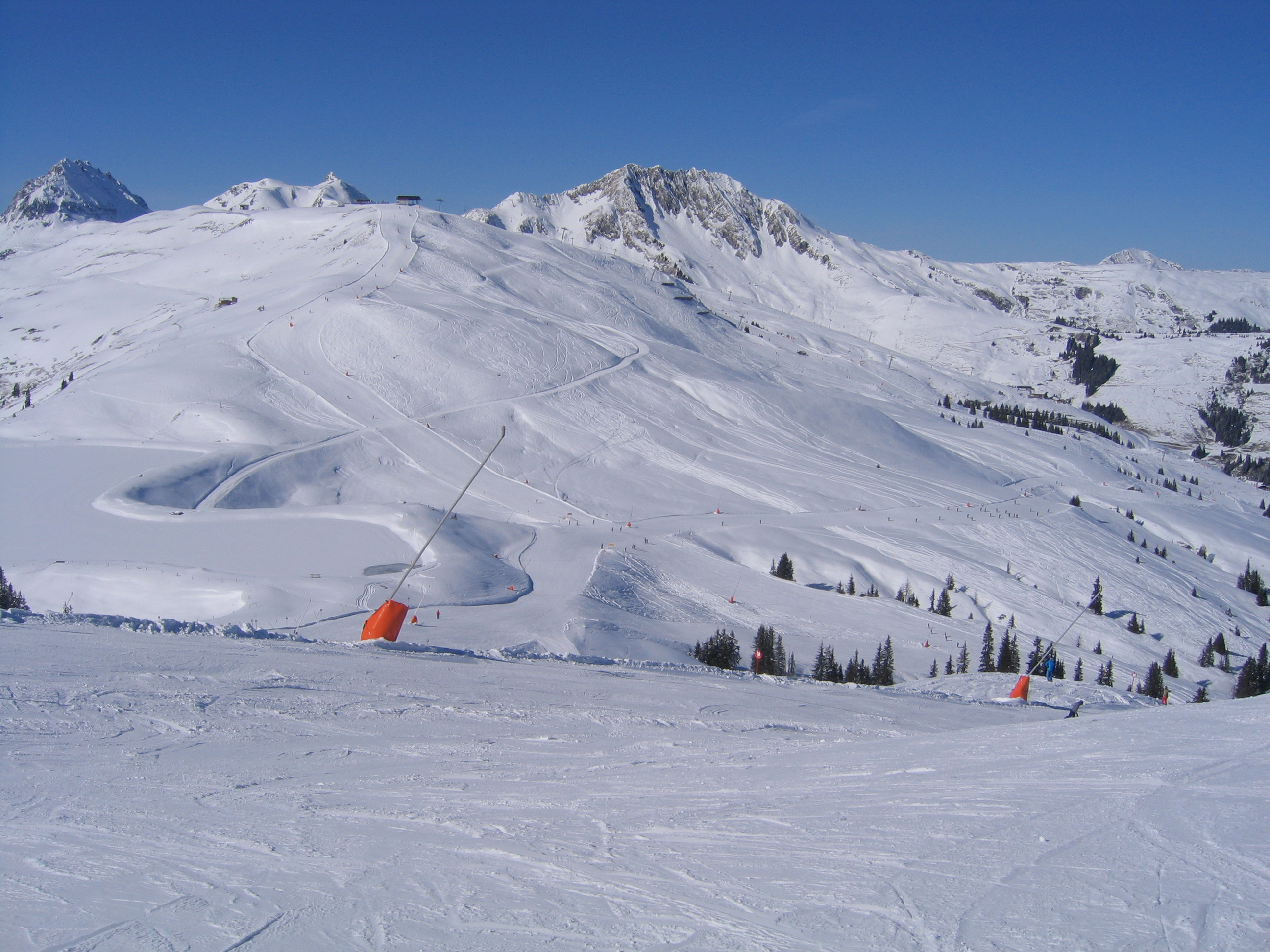
The Kleiner Rettenstein in winter seen from the Resterhöhe

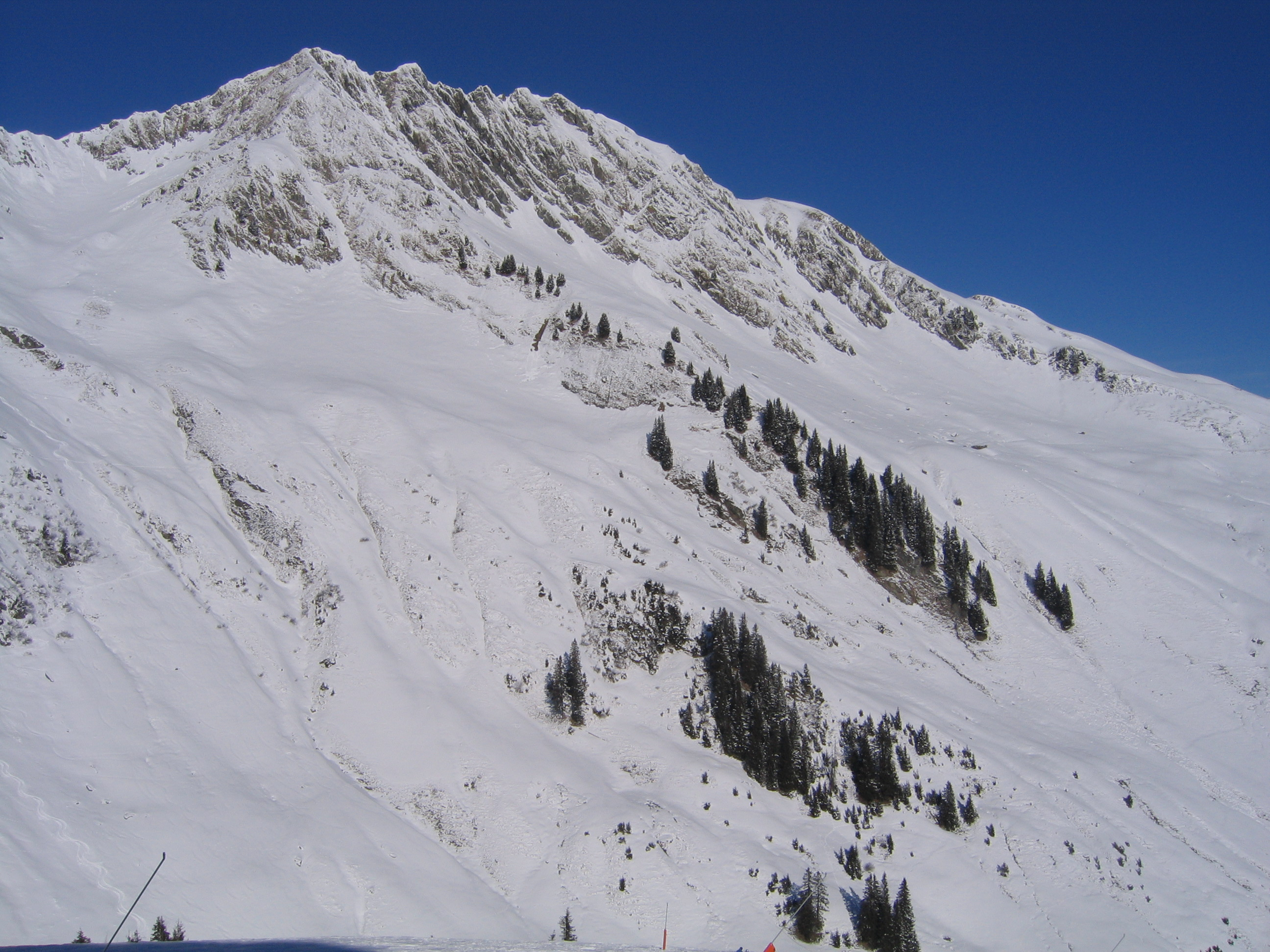
The southeast face of the Kleiner Rettenstein
