= Wildkogel =

Grass mountain in Salzburg, Austria

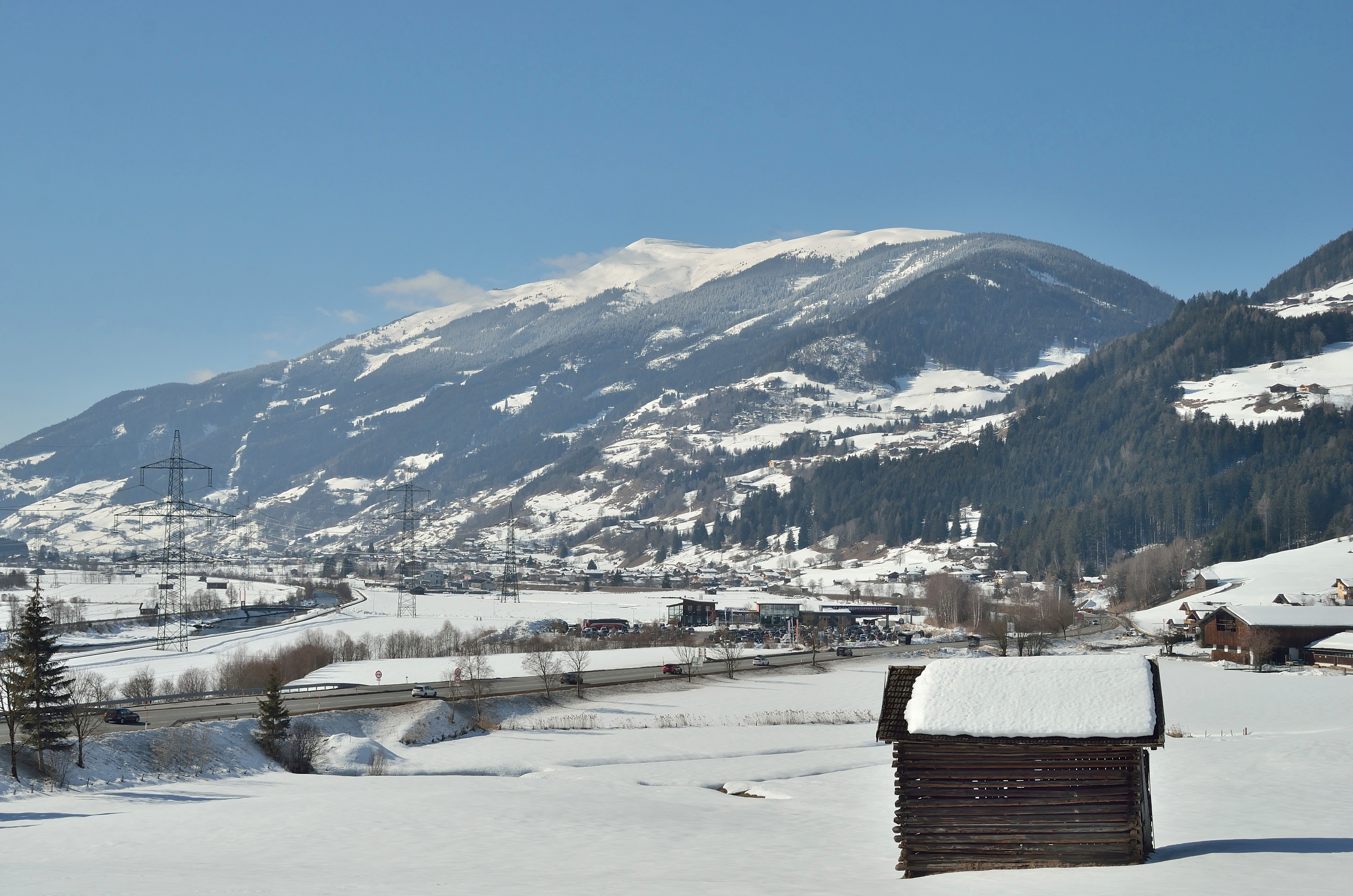

Highest point
- Elevation: 2,224 m (7,297 ft)
- Coordinates: 47°17′N 12°17′E

Naming
- Language of name: German
- Pronunciation: German: [ˈvɪltˌkoːɡəl]

Geography
- Location within Austria
- Location: Oberpinzgau, Salzburg, Austria
- Parent range: Kitzbühel Alps

The Wildkogel is a 2,224-metre (7,297 ft) high grass mountain in the Kitzbühel Alps in Oberpinzgau in Salzburg. It lies north of the Salzach river valley and the nearby towns of Neukirchen and Bramberg.

At 2,005 metres (6,578 ft) high, the Wildkogelhaus (built in 1898) can host up to 100 guests (with restaurants, sauna and disco). Here begins a 14-kilometre (8.7 mi) long toboggan run.

During the winter, there is a large ski area with 55 kilometres (34 mi) of groomed ski trails, 45% blue, 40% red and 15% black. The highest lift takes passengers to 2,150 metres (7,050 ft). There is a 6-seater cable car with a stopover, a six-chairlift, two four-chair lifts, one double chairlift, five lift-e and four T-bar lifts. Descents are possible into the towns of Neukirchen (1,300 m or 4,300 ft, length 5 km or 3.1 mi) and Bramberg (length 14 km or 8.7 mi).

On the mountain, at 200 kilometres (120 mi) is the longest trail ("Pinzga") to be found in the Salzburg state.

In the summer season, there are many hiking possibilities (altitude hiking). The Wildkogel offers cycling for mountain bikes ( "Bike-Arena"), and also the participants of the yearly held Transalp have to cross. The mountain is also a popular starting point for cross-country flights with the paraglider, as the Pinzgau is thermally very reliable.

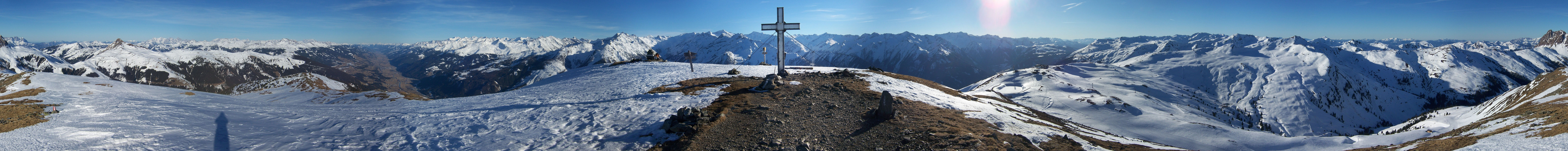
360-degree panorama of Wildkogel.
