= Müllenbach, Cochem-Zell =

Müllenbach
- Municipality
- Coat of arms

- Location of Müllenbach within Cochem-Zell district
- Interactive map of Müllenbach
- Location within Germany Location within Rhineland-Palatinate
- Coordinates: 50°13′21″N 7°3′51″E
- Country: Germany
- State: Rhineland-Palatinate
- District: Cochem-Zell
- Municipal assoc.: Kaisersesch

Government
  - Mayor (2019–24): Andreas Klotz

Area
  - Total: 4.27 km^{2} (1.65 sq mi)
- Elevation: 470 m (1,540 ft)

Population (2025-12-31)
  - Total: 682
  - Density: 160/km^{2} (414/sq mi)
- Time zone: UTC+01:00 (CET)
  - Summer (DST): UTC+02:00 (CEST)
- Postal codes: 56761
- Dialling codes: 02653
- Vehicle registration: COC

Müllenbach (German pronunciation: [ˈmʏlənbax]) is an Ortsgemeinde – a municipality belonging to a Verbandsgemeinde, a kind of collective municipality, in the Cochem-Zell district in Rhineland-Palatinate, Germany. It belongs to the Verbandsgemeinde of Kaisersesch, whose seat is in the like-named town.

== Geography ==
The municipality lies in the Eifel near Mayen.

== History ==
=== Prehistory and antiquity ===
A razor blade dating from between 700 and 500 BC – Hallstatt times – was found west of what is today the sporting ground. Another ancient archaeological find has been a Roman cremation site from the 1st century AD, found some 200 to 250 m southeast of the parish church in the cadastral area called “Rosenberg”.

=== Middle Ages ===
Müllenbach may have had its first documentary mention in 1036 as Michelembach sup Cumitato, but historians are doubtful that this refers to Müllenbach. However, if it does, Archbishop Poppo of Trier had holdings in the village at this time. In 1052, the Hochpochten Forest had its first documentary mention when Archbishop Eberhard of Trier donated the forest of Puthena to Saint Martin's Foundation in Münstermaifeld. Müllenbach's first unequivocal documentary mention came on 1 May 1333 when Aleidis, Heinrich von Molinbach's widow, sold her inheritance from her mother in Düngenheim for 100 Denare to the Stuben Monastery.

In the years 1349 and 1350, the Eifel was swept by the Plague. On 11 December 1357, Sir Konrad von Brohl, a knight, was enfeoffed by Rupert I, Elector Palatine with the village of Mollenbach, along with the Hause Kaldenbrunnen (Kalenborn), Haurode (Hauroth) and Gut Rode (later Gerhardsroth) in the Mastbrecht (Masburg) court district.

It is known that witch-hunts in the area reached a height between 1500 and 1650, and although there is no record of such things happening in Müllenbach, it is reasonable to assume that the village was caught up in this madness.

=== Early modern times ===
In 1534 came a report of a “doerfflein nudorff nit weit von Mollenbach gelegen” (“little village Nudorff lying not far from Müllenbach”), which could refer to the place now known as Neuhof. In 1543, a Weistum showed that the Counts of Virneburg were lords of the court and landholders in Müllenbach (a Weistum – cognate with English wisdom – was a legal pronouncement issued by men learned in law in the Middle Ages and early modern times). The village was administered by the Electoral-Trier Amt of Mayen. In 1548, the Electorate of Trier received the same rights over Müllenbach as the Counts of Virneburg had had before.

Müllenbach's earliest population figure dates from 1563, when the Electoral-Trier Feuerbuch (“Firebook”) stated that there were 23 hearths (for this, read “households”; this corresponds to a population of roughly 130 to 150).

A chapel in Müllenbach was mentioned in 1621. In 1657, it was reported that the chapel in Müllenbach was consecrated to Saint Hubert. Furthermore, it was the chaplain from Masburg who said Mass, for which he received 13 Gulden from the municipality, but he had to obtain the sacramental wine himself. In 1680, twenty families were living in Müllenbach, which works out to roughly the same population as in 1563 (130 to 150), which is somewhat remarkable, given that this was a time of wars – the Thirty Years' War had ended in 1648 – and Plague. In 1695, records from the Mayen-Monreal financial administration mention for the first time slate mining in Müllenbach as a business subject to levies (called the Deckleyenzehnt, or roughly “roofing stone tithe”).

=== 18th century ===
In 1703, 16 families from Müllenbach built up a fund of money and other tangible assets to establish a benefice in the village. On 17 March of the following year, the ecclesiastical authorities establish the first benefice in Saint Hubert's and Saint Anthony's honour in Müllenbach. The first curate was Father Jakob Heinrich Jäger, who was introduced to his Müllenbach office by the parish priest from Masburg. Father Jäger was the curate until 1718.

In 1724, as the result of a new enfeoffment, H. Arendt from Müllenbach was assigned the slate mine in Hochpochten and was granted three tax-free years to offset the trouble and cost of putting the site in order. In 1725, the church books mentioned the Kaulenmühle (mill) for the first time when Nikolaus May from Müllenbach married his first wife Elisabeth Niederelz on 16 October 1725 in Masburg. In 1733, a new chapel was built to accommodate not only the village's growing population, but also worshippers who came from Laubach and Hochpochten to attend Mass. The new nave measured 21 × 21 (local, not British) feet, or about 7 × 7 m. However, it had no organ, no sacristy nor even a confessional.

Another mill was first mentioned in 1741, the Kolfenmühle on the river Endert, along with its owner, Matthias Kolf. It was called the Zirwesmühle once Servatius Arenz took it over in 1750. It stood on the other side of the Müllenbach, where that stream empties into the Endert.

In 1749, Müllenbach's curate was Heinrich Esch, born in Prüm, who held the post until 1769, when Bartholomäus Gilles, born in Müllenbach, succeeded him. Father Gilles was known for – rather hamfistedly – fighting for his congregation's “rights”. He held the post until 1786, but the records also mention another curate, Johann Peter Rhein, born in Metternich (today a Stadtteil of Koblenz), in the years 1771 and 1772.

In 1770, after Head Forester Michels had caught the Müllenbach swineherd unlawfully grazing his swine in Hochpochten for the third time, he was set on, despite threatening to shoot, by six or seven men from Müllenbach – among them the mayor – and beaten so badly “that only one man from Laubach who put himself between them saved his life”. Head Forester Michels's troubles, however, were not over. In 1774, Father Gilles accused him of luring the clergyman into a house, where the forester threatened and insulted him, and then waylaid him in the forest in such a way that the pastor feared for his life. Head Forester Michels, for his part, claimed that he had demanded that Father Gilles hand over the money that Michels had had to pay at the Dingtag (the local moot) for some stolen brushwood. At this, Father Gilles had apparently become physically abusive and driven Michels out of the house, swearing at him by calling him such unchurchmanlike things as Hundspfott (“dog dropping”) and Scheisskerl (something akin to “bastard” in the colloquial sense, but literally meaning “shit-fellow”).

From 1781 to 1783, the rights to mine the slate deposit in Müllenbach were held by the Cologne merchant Paffrath. He commissioned Karl Rido (or Rideaux) from Fumay in France to do the mining. Rideaux brought many of his kin along with him from Fumay. The French slate miners brought to Müllenbach valuable knowledge and saw to an upswing in the slate mining industry in the region. Since then, many French names have cropped up in the Müllenbach church register: Lefevre, Allard, Bourgeoise, Dardenne, Doudoux, Goffart, Pasfort, Regnier and Sarde, to name a few.

In 1784, there were 66 family heads living in 65 houses in Müllenbach, suggesting a population of just under 400. In 1785, a Visitation protocol from the parish of Masburg mentions that Müllenbach freeman Niclas Stoll was a Sendschöffe (a kind of judicial representative), and furthermore that he had held this post already for six years. In 1788, there were 60 family heads living in Müllenbach, and in 1789 there were 62. This year also saw a new curate arrive on the scene, Johann Thelen, born in Monreal. He served until 1802. In 1790, there were 63 family heads living in Müllenbach. In 1791, records at Springiersbach Monastery showed that a parcel of cropland of 1.29 ha was auctioned to a farmer from Müllenbach named M. Steffen.

=== Napoleonic times and 19th century ===
After the annexation of the Rhine’s left bank by Napoleon’s troops in 1794, Müllenbach was assigned to the Mairie (“Mayoralty”) of Kaisersesch. The first few years of the 19th century brought the village two new curates, Peter Joseph Pauli in 1802, born in Maring and serving until 1805, and replacing him, Philipp Reichards. He served until 1818, and he has the distinction of being Müllenbach's last curate and first parish priest, for in 1806, a longstanding goal was reached: Müllenbach was finally raised to parish. Father Reichards was born in Demerath on 6 May 1754 and was ordained in Trier on 27 March 1784. He died in Düngenheim on 11 December 1830. In 1808, after the chapel at Martental had been deconsecrated, the chapel bell was brought to Müllenbach, where it long served as the school bell and the fire bell. In 1810, Laubach was parochially annexed to Müllenbach.

After the French had been driven out by Blücher, Müllenbach was still in the old Mairie of Kaisersesch, only now it was the Bürgermeisterei (also "Mayoralty") of Kaisersesch under the new Prussian administration.

On 10 April 1815, a huge eruption of Mount Tambora on the now Indonesian island of Sumbawa formed an ash cloud that darkened the atmosphere, which in many parts of the Northern Hemisphere brought about the following year what has come to be known as the Year Without a Summer. The winter leading up to this was especially harsh in the Eifel. Snow lay on the ground until June. Harvesting could only be done in October, and then only in part, as new frost came, destroying the greater part of the crops. Famine followed. In 1817, 392 inhabitants were counted in Müllenbach, all of whom were Catholic. On 5 December of this year in the Hochpochten wooded area, 3 of the 9 members of the so-called Alfler Bande were caught. These people were suspected of having murdered the Kaifenheim parish priest on 21 November; 5 further members were caught in Alflen.

In 1818, Müllenbach's parish priest was Johann Heinrich Schmitt, born in Ransbach, who held the post until 1824. He was then succeeded by Franz Joseph Steffes, born in Alflen, who served until 1845. Also in 1824, the parish of Müllenbach was assigned to the Diocese of Trier; in 1827, it was also assigned to the deaconry of Cochem. The first gallery mine in the slate mountains of the Rhine's left bank was opened on the Escherkaul. The mine was called Höllenpforte – “Hell’s Gate”.

In 1832, there were 550 people living in Müllenbach, belonging to 140 families. In the same year, Philipp Reichard is named as the schoolteacher; the parish priest was apparently satisfied with him. In 1839, the Prussian administration allowed the municipality of Müllenbach to hold two markets: a trading market on the fourth Thursday after Easter, and a livestock market on the second Monday before Saint Bartholomew's Day (24 August). In 1840, there were 715 inhabitants in Müllenbach living in 115 houses. Plans were being made to build a new church. In 1842, Landrat (District Chairman) Schönberger sent Mayor Driesch of Kaisersesch a letter asking him to explain law-flouting incidents that had been happening in Müllenbach after abuse of alcohol – notably one that had seen a young man stabbed several times. He asked him to address the situation and, if need be, hire police specially for the village – at the municipality's own expense, of course.

On 19 March 1843, a great fire ravaged Müllenbach, and could not be put out until the following morning. The toll was 35 houses, 27 barns full of livestock, produce and equipment. Luckily, there were no human deaths. Joseph Schmitz was named in 1846 as Müllenbach's mayor. It is unknown whether this was in fact Mathias Joseph Schmitz, the famous bell pourer. He was furthermore named as the endower of the windows at the parish church with the motif featuring Saint Matthew. Joseph Schmitz's deputy was Peter Miesen. The same year, the economic crisis also made itself felt in Müllenbach as many slate miners lost their jobs in the wake of the downturn in the slate market. The new parish priest was Nikolaus Guldner, born in Dillingen. He is held to be the builder of the new parish church in 1855. He served until 1865.

Municipal council took a decision in 1847 to build the new church. Meanwhile, the economic crisis gave way the following year to another upheaval: revolution. Locally, the bailiff Hartrath found his activities thwarted by Müllenbach inhabitants, and indeed he was hounded out of the village under “a rain of stones”.

Johann Steffes-hoff became in 1848 the first Müllenbacher to emigrate to the United States; many others followed.

On 25 October of the same year, yet another bailiff in Müllenbach found himself at odds with the villagers. He had wanted to gather monies that were due the authorities, but he, too, was driven from the village, this time in the face of swearing and cursing, and under a rain of, not stones, but rather rotten fruit. Despite this somewhat less violent expulsion than the one that Hartrath had faced, this time there were consequences. Once the bailiff had reported to his employer what had happened, the monarchical leadership in Berlin sent specially an infantry company of 280 men to Müllenbach to restore order. Things had calmed down enough by 29 December, when the 28th Infantry Regiment under Major von Pannewitz withdrew. The costs for billeting the whole regiment had to be borne by the villagers.

In 1849, Peter Miesen was the mayor and his deputy was Johann Welling III. By 1850, the economic situation was improving, and slate, which had been stored or stockpiled, could be sold, meaning that the supply, bit by bit, had to be replenished; 150 men went back to work in the pits. In 1852, the old chapel was torn down so that a new church building could use the site. The foundation stone was laid on 29 September by Bishop Arnoldi, who also consecrated the new church on 8 July 1855. Three bells had been poured for the new church by Mathias Schmitz of Müllenbach. The biggest one was a gift from Prince Wilhelm, who later became William I, German Emperor.

On 9 March 1853, sixteen slate miners were trapped by a rockfall inside the “Olligskaul 1” mine. They spent 16 to 18 hours buried in the mine before they could be rescued. There were no deaths, nor even injuries.

In 1857, Joseph Schmitz was Müllenbach's mayor, and his deputy was Johann Franzen. There were 765 inhabitants in Müllenbach in 1858, 762 of whom were Catholic, and three of whom were Evangelical. In 1861, Johann Josef Köhn was Müllenbach's mayor and in 1864 it was Johann Joseph Franzen. In 1865, there was a new parish priest, Johann Litzinger, born in Ehrenbreitstein (today a Stadtteil of Koblenz); he served until 1871. In 1869, the parish of Müllenbach was assigned to the deaconry of Kaisersesch. In 1871, there were 800 inhabitants in Müllenbach. The new parish priest then was Johann Kowastch, born in Saarwellingen; he served until 1884. In 1872, Anton Schmitt and Katharina Knauf were mentioned as schoolteachers. Father Kowastch's observation about them was: "They do their duty". In 1873, Johann Peter Bohr was Müllenbach's mayor.

=== Imperial Germany ===
By 1876, the municipality's population had dropped to 790. This same year also brought the Kulturkampf, which saw Father Pörzgen, the parish priest in Masburg, thrown out of his job and forbidden to practise spiritual guidance. The effect that this had was overcrowding in Müllenbach's church, as the faithful from Father Pörzgen's parish (Eppenberg, Hauroth and Kalenborn) made their way to Müllenbach to attend services. This led to trouble, with pews always full to overflowing, and resentment among Müllenbachers about having to stand in their church, and so on.

In 1878, Mathias Gilles was Müllenbach's mayor, and the parish priest was Josef Miesen, born 28 March 1831 in Müllenbach. In 1880, in the cadastral area called “Wolfsburg” near Leienkaul (roughly 2 km from Müllenbach), the last wolf in the eastern Eifel was shot. In 1884, the parish priest was Matthias Weber (known as Kära Mattes), born in Körrig, an outlying centre of Merzkirchen. He served until 1892. In 1885, Franz Steffes-Holländer was Müllenbach's mayor, and in 1889, it was once again Johann Peter Bohr. There were 751 inhabitants in Müllenbach in 1890. This same year, Father Weber also became the school inspector.

Snow was still lying on the ground – about 60 cm of it – on 1 April 1891, and although the year was nowhere near as bad as the Year Without a Summer (1816), the unusually late frost killed most of the winter crops.

In 1892, there was a new parish priest, Hugo Kirchgässer, born in Oberwesel; he served until 1901. On 2 December 1895, a census yielded 892 as Müllenbach's population figure. Of these, 440 were male and 452 female, 881 were Catholic, 6 were Evangelical and 5 were Jewish. Inhabited buildings numbered 148. In 1897, Peter Lefev was Müllenbach's mayor, and in 1899, it was Peter Schmitz. Another census in 1900 revealed that 932 people lived in Müllenbach, among whom were 200 children attending primary school.

In 1901, there was a new parish priest, Franz Kirchesch, born in Wissen; he served until 1912. In 1903, Bartholomäus Schmitz was Müllenbach's mayor. Another census held in 1905 found that the village's population was “half male, half female”. It is unclear how this could be said when the total population figure was 905 – an odd number. Also in 1905, oil lamps were replaced with carbide lamps in the slate mines. They gave off a brighter light and were held to be more conducive to miners’ health. Another innovation came to the mines in 1908. The Müllenbacher Dachschieferwerk began using a diesel-powered railway to haul slates. Another railway with cable-hauled slate cars was also built. This same year, Peter Schmitz was Müllenbach's mayor once again. The 2 December 1910 census put the number of villagers at 946. In 1911, there was a murder in Müllenbach: on the night of 2 to 3 February, a boy named Anton Lehnen, from Müllenbach, was done to death by five lads, also from Müllenbach. They were all found guilty in court in Koblenz on 3 May. One was released early, and the three ringleaders, Peter Krämer I, Reuter and Lefev, were, owing to mitigating circumstances, sentenced to prison terms ranging from 9 to 10 years. Peter Krämer II got half a year in jail. The newspaper reported the crime, expressing revulsion at the murderers’ bestiality. In 1912, Müllenbach's parish priest was Cornelius Mehren, born in Damscheid, who held the post until 1921.

=== First World War ===
On 1 August 1914, war broke out between Germany and Austria-Hungary on the one side, and Russia, France and Serbia on the other. On Friday 31 July, towards 5 o’clock in the morning, a rider had come from Kaisersesch, bringing the news of the declaration of war. In 1915, Stephan Valerius was Müllenbach's mayor, and his deputy was Mathias Josef Gilles. Later that same year, though, the deputy took over the mayor's office, and his deputy was Mr. Scheider. Amid the general fear that the Great War would last longer than first expected, older youth were being readied for military service. The parochial company numbered 75 men, each of whom received a soldier's cap. Because wages were so unsatisfactory at the slate mines, many younger and still spry older workers left their jobs at the pits and sought work and better wages in the Low Countries or in munitions factories, especially in Siegburg and Troisdorf. Even many girls found paying jobs in these factories. In September, men who had already been declared unfit for military service were nonetheless mustered again, and this time, most of them were found to be fit.

From autumn 1915 to May of the following year, constant cannon fire could be heard from Verdun, about 150 km from Müllenbach. To save on kerosene, the clocks were all put ahead one hour on 30 April 1916 so that better use could be made of daylight. The oil shortage was mitigated somewhat by organized gathering of beechnuts. Schoolchildren managed to gather up some 100 kg to sell to the Royal Forest Administration, and were allowed to keep half their beechnuts. On 4 December 1916, the churchbells were set ringing on His Majesty's orders on the occasion of the victory on the river Argeş. This resulted in great jubilation in Müllenbach, and many thought that they were hearing a "peace peal".

It was the last time the bells would announce such an event: in late July 1917, they were taken away to be used for war requirements. They were melted down to make munitions and weapons. By 1918, there was no dearth of soldiers who did not want to go back to their posts after taking leave, and about ten to fifteen deserters lurked in the Müllenbach area, stealing chickens, livestock, food and even money. By autumn, though, the thieves were behind bars.

=== Occupation and Weimar Republic ===
On 11 November 1918 came the Armistice. On 27 November came the first German soldiers marching home from the now ended war. They kept coming through the area until 2 December. A week later, American soldiers showed up and took over the schoolrooms as their billet, leaving again on 11 December. More Americans came on 15 December. These ones stayed until 4 April 1919. A hygiene ordinance issued by the US occupational authorities in 1919 gives one an idea of the state of hygiene in Müllenbach at the time, and perhaps less importantly, of the state of linguistic ability in the United States Army at that time, for it was written in humorously bad German. It even went as far as to begin with the sentence: "Es ist streng verboten zu scheissen neben die Hauser oder auf die Strassen." This one sentence alone contains several structural blunders (mostly involving word order and case inflections), one swearword (the sixth one, which means "to shit") and a word missing an umlaut (the ninth one). Nonetheless, the ordinance demonstrates a concern for the village's state of cleanliness. The intended meaning was “It is strictly forbidden to defecate next to houses or on the streets.” The last US troops withdrew from Müllenbach in July of the same year.

Fear, however, still beset the area as "Stumpfarm" ("Stump-Arm") – or Johann Wilhelm Mayer, to use his actual name – was still at large. He is said to have been the area's most dangerous criminal, a serial killer. He was caught on 10 August 1919, and beheaded in 1923.

In late August 1919, Rheinische Basaltwerke AG started new basalt mines on the Hoechst. A railway spur was built to serve the operation. Electric lighting came to Müllenbach in 1920. The same year also brought industrial strife to the municipality, and there was a ten-day strike at the slate mines. In 1921, there was a new parish priest, Peter Klein, born in Korweiler; he served until 1925.

The rampant inflation in Germany in the early 1920s led locally – and indeed nationally – to a great upswing in crop thefts and wood thefts in 1923. By 1925, the village's population had shrunk to 726 (745 Catholics, 5 Evangelicals and 12 Jews), and the basalt mines were shut down owing to unprofitability. The slate mines, however, were doing well by this time. In 1926, there was a new parish priest, Wilhelm Zils, born in Trier; he served until 1941. In 1927, all the slate miners ended up on welfare as all the slate mines were shut down.

The French, who had been occupying the Rhineland since the First World War ended, withdrew from the Second Zone of Occupation on the night of 30 November to 1 December 1929, and on 30 June 1930, they also withdrew from the Third Zone of Occupation.

=== Third Reich ===
In 1932, the Nazis were gaining in popularity. Their supporters’ numbers rose in this year from 19 to 52, and at elections in 1933, 118 Müllenbachers cast votes for the NSDAP. On 21 March of that year, with the opening of the Reichstag, the National Socialists’ seizure of power was celebrated in Müllenbach with a torchlight parade through the village. Not long thereafter, shoppers were being harassed and blocked from entering the Mayer butcher shop at Dorfstraße 116 in Müllenbach – a Jewish-owned business. The harassers were Brownshirts, at first ones from outside the village, but later also local ones. The mayor in Nazi times was Josef Steffes-Ollig. Nazi youth groups were also formed in Müllenbach in 1934. In 1936, Emanuel and Moses Mayer's butchering business was shut down by the Nazis. Brownshirts broke windows at their houses and shouted taunts.

With Hitler's Invasion of Poland on 1 September 1939, the Second World War began. The need to guard Germany's nearby western border saw to it that there were many troops in the village, usually about 500 to 600, but at times as many as 1,000 to 1,200. On 9 May 1940 came the marching orders as Hitler pursued the Battle of France, which began the next day. On 30 April 1942, Müllenbach's Jewish inhabitants (Emanuel, Johanna and Julius Mayer and a foster-child named Heinrich) were deported to a death camp in Poland. Emanuel's and Johanna's names appear in a list of the dead from the Izbica ghetto.

In 1942, there was a new parish priest, Alois Fuchs, born in Hüttigweiler (an outlying centre of Illingen); he served only 10 months before being replaced later the same year by Theodor Gilen, born in Ehlenz. He served until 1958.

On 6 March 1945, American forces overran Laubach, and after an ill-advised attempt by a lieutenant and a small group of soldiers to hold the Americans back, resulting in three of the group being killed, the Americans also came into Müllenbach, whose inhabitants put up no fight.

=== After the Second World War ===
Müllenbach's first post-Nazi mayor was Johann Konz. On 1 October 1945, the local school opened its doors once again to schoolchildren, rather than to soldiers as it had had to later in the war. In 1946, Phillip Lanser succeeded Johann Konz as mayor. That same year, a census yielded a figure of 226 households in Müllenbach with 746 inhabitants. This year also saw Müllenbach become part of the then newly founded state of Rhineland-Palatinate.

In 1948, Franz Gilles was the mayor and his deputy was Johann Konz. Gilles died the next year and was succeeded by Johann Klotz; Johann Konz continued to be the mayor's deputy. On 13 October 1949, Müllenbach's last prisoner of war came home after 5 years in Allied prison camps. In late May 1950, rationing, which had begun in 1939, was ended. A census on 13 September of that same year showed a population of 732 (347 male, 385 female; 782 Catholic, 9 Evangelical, 1 Russian Orthodox). In early October, 3 refugee families were housed by the municipality.

In late February 1952, work began on a munitions camp in Hochpochten, thus bringing jobs to those in need of a livelihood, if only for a matter of months. Johann Klotz became the mayor this year; his deputy was Franz Schmitz. In 1953, two women who were burning off grass at the edge of one of their fields caused a great explosion, badly injuring the two. The fire had spread to a neighbouring former anti-aircraft gun facility, setting off munitions stored there.

By 1956, Müllenbach's population had shrunk to 699. In 1957, the Bundeswehr took over the munitions camp in Hochpochten, and this created jobs for older men and senior citizens who could serve as watchmen or munitions workers. In 1958, there was a new parish priest, Richard Koch, born in Saarbrücken; he served until 1969.

On the night of 8 to 9 January 1959, nature put an end to all slate mining in Müllenbach, Laubach and Leienkaul. Meltwater from snow breached the three pits of the one mining operation that had remained open, "Maria Schacht", and within one night flooded the whole operation, destroying tools, machines and explosives. The flood was too much even for the pumps that had been installed to keep the pits free of water. This catastrophe threw all the pitmen out of work, and they had to seek jobs elsewhere.

On 4 December 1960, a hurricane raged over the area knocking down telegraph poles, blowing windows in, lifting roofs off and littering roads and railways with fallen trees. In 1961, the population had sunk to 652. In 1966, Erhardt Franzen became Müllenbach's mayor; his deputy was Josef Berenz. In 1967, after a ministerial edict on 12 June and an order from the district chairman's office on 16 August to the effect that the municipality of Müllenbach should voluntarily merge with that of Laubach-Leienkaul, Müllenbach municipal council unanimously voted to refuse to do so.

In 1969, Josef Gilles was the mayor and his deputy was Heinz Peters. There was also a new parish priest, Dr. Bernd Bothe, born in Schelmkappe, an outlying centre of Löningen; he served only until the next year, when he was replaced by Peter van Iersel, born in Best in the Netherlands, but he did not last long, either. He died unexpectedly of heart failure in 1972. In 1970, there were 713 people in Müllenbach (679 Catholics, 28 Evangelicals and 6 others).

A crime spree came to an end in Müllenbach in 1970. Police from Cochem were pursuing a car thief who had been stealing cars all over West Germany. Police fired warning shots and the car that the thief was driving ended up in a roadside ditch. He fled on foot but was arrested the next morning in Müllenbach. The 17-year-old and his accomplice, also 17, were charged with stealing about 30 cars throughout the country.

The new parish priest in Müllenbach in 1972, succeeding to the post after Father Peter van Iersel's death, was Konrad Flatau, born in Heilsberg, East Prussia (now Lidzbark Warmiński, Poland); he served until the next year when he was succeeded by Wilhelm Freytag, born in Ankum. Father Freytag served until 1979. In 1974, Heinz Peters was the mayor and his deputy was Paul Klotz and then, after Peters's reelection in 1979, Walter Tholl, and after his reelection in 1984, Rudi Gilles. Also in 1979, Johannes Walhorn, born in Osnabrück, became the new parish priest; he served until 1993. In 1989, Rudi Gilles was the mayor and his deputy was Josef Lanser.

In the early morning of 13 April 1991, towards 3:20, a strong earthquake shook the region. Its epicentre lay near Roermond in the Netherlands. It registered 5.9 on the Richter scale. In 1993, there was a new parish priest, Ferdinand Koch, born in Henri-Chapelle, an outlying centre of Welkenraedt in Belgium; he served until the next year when he was succeeded by Hubert Goebel (or Göbel), born in Mundersbach, who served until 2008.

In October 1994, there was an uproar when, in a marquee full of people, a 30-year-old man from neighbouring Kaisersesch chose the occasion of the playing of the National Anthem to give the Nazi salute. In June of the following year, a court in Cochem fined him 1,800 marks for this indiscretion.

In 1997, a population of 730 was reported for Müllenbach, of whom 45 maintained a secondary residence in the municipality. By 1999, this had risen to 754 in 349 families living in 269 houses (381 male, 373 female; 652 Catholics, 48 Evangelicals, 54 others). In 1999, Josef Lanser was the mayor. In the same election, Nicole Laux became the first woman to serve on municipal council. In 2000, Müllenbach's municipal forest became one of the first to receive Forest Stewardship Council certification.

=== 21st century ===
At 31 December 2003, the State Statistical Office reported that Müllenbach had 284 residential buildings with 333 dwellings. The population figure was 703 (350 men and 353 women), who fell into the following age groups: 1.8% under 3 years, 2.6% 3–5 years, 3.8% 6–9 years, 11.4% 10–19 years, 7.1% 20–29 years, 34.4% 30–49 years, 9.7% 50–59 years, 20.9% 60–74 years and 8.3% 75 years and older. There were six agricultural businesses and agricultural land amounted to 94 ha. In 2004, Andreas Klotz was the mayor and his deputy was Dirk Barbye. By 2006, the population figure was 737 (370 men and 367 women). In mid November, the new development area “Am Heiligenhäuschen/Im Seufen” was opened up. By the end of the year, AJE Consulting, a company based in Roes, had brought wireless Internet service to the municipality. On 18 and 19 January, the windstorm Kyrill swept across Germany. Locally, there was not much damage – a few roof tiles were blown away and a few trees were brought down – and nobody was injured. On 4 August 2007 at about 4:50 AM, an earthquake measuring 4 on the Richter scale shook the area; the epicentre was in Plaidt.

On 1 December 2008, Father Ernst-Walter Fuß, who had taken over as parish priest from Father Hubert Göbel, was named by Bishop Robert Brahm as Dean of the deaconry of Karden-Martental for the coming seven years. In 2009, the population was 680 (328 men and 352 women). This same year, Andreas Klotz became mayor of Müllenbach, and for the first time, the local school had no beginners at all, a result of the shrinking birthrate. Volker Malburg became the new parish priest.

== Politics ==
=== Municipal council ===
The council is made up of 12 council members, who were elected at the municipal election held on 7 June 2009, and the honorary mayor as chairman.

The municipal election held on 7 June 2009 yielded the following results:

	FWG Klotz	FWG Lanser	Total
2009	10	2	12 seats
2004	7	5	12 seats

=== Mayor ===
Müllenbach's mayor is Andreas Klotz, and his deputies are Dirk Barbye and Dieter Laux.

=== Coat of arms ===
The municipality's arms might be described thus: Per saltire first vert a stag's head caboshed attired and ensigned with a cross Latin Or, second Or a waterwheel spoked of four sable, third Or a bell of the third, and fourth vert two pickaxes in saltire argent.

The charge in the first field, the stag's head with the cross on top, is Saint Hubert's attribute, thus representing the church's patron saint. The waterwheel in the second field refers to the origin of the name Müllenbach (“mill” is Mühle in German). The bell in the third field refers to the former Matthias Schmitz bellfounding business. The charge in base, the two pickaxes, refers to the former slate mining industry.

== Culture and sightseeing ==
=== Buildings ===
The following are listed buildings or sites in Rhineland-Palatinate’s Directory of Cultural Monuments:

- Saint Hubert's Catholic Parish Church (Pfarrkirche St. Hubertus), Hauptstraße 37 – three-naved basilica, 1853–1855, architect Vincenz Statz, Cologne
- Hauptstraße 13 – pietà, 18th century
- Hauptstraße 24 – pastoral relief, 18th century
