= Mühlenbach (Werre) =

River in Germany

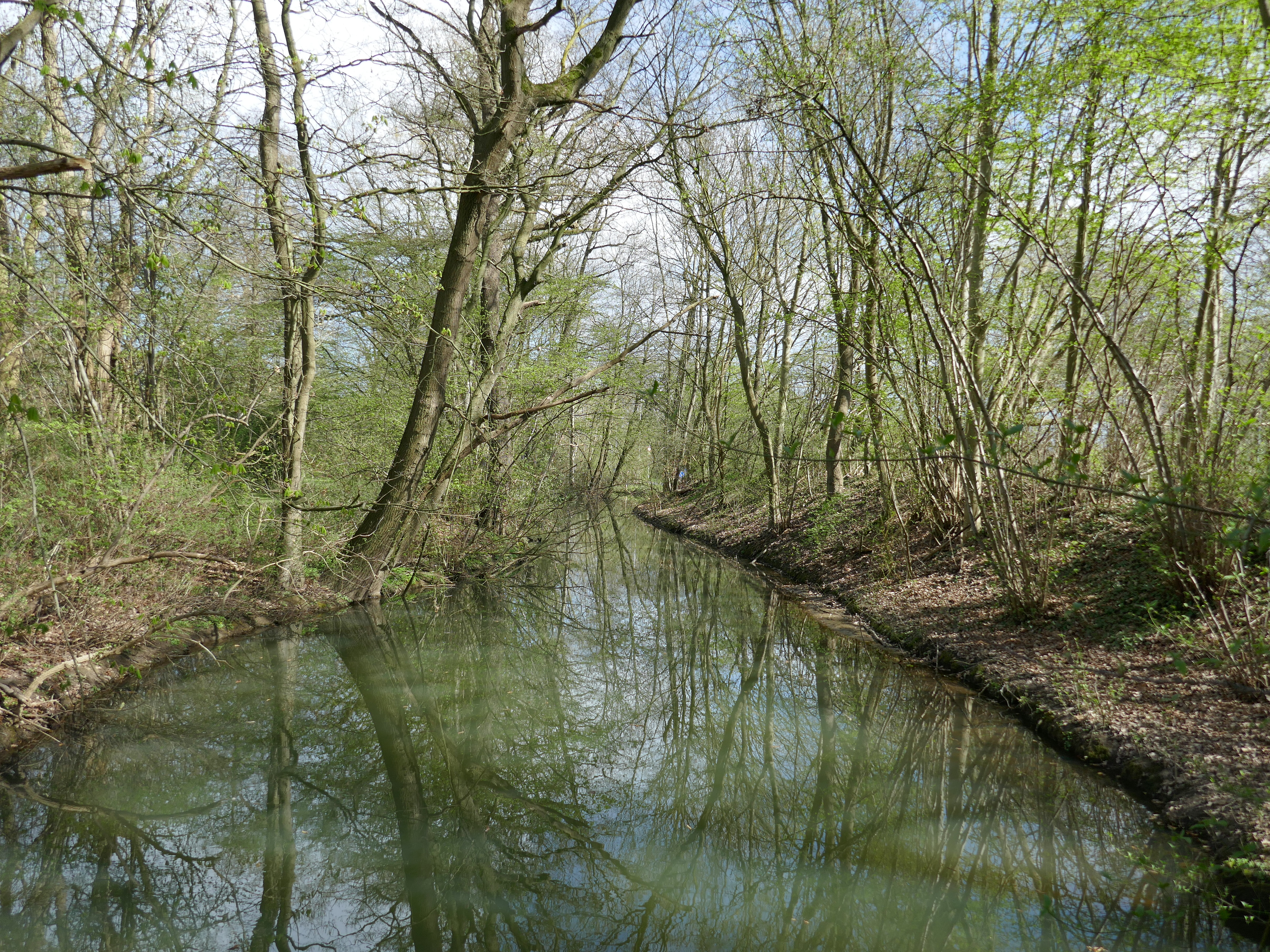

Location
- Country: Germany
- State: North Rhine-Westphalia

Physical characteristics
- Mouth
  - location: Werre
  - coordinates: 52.2029°N 8.7243°E
- Length: 2.3 km (1.4 mi)

Basin features
- Progression: Werre→ Weser→ North Sea

Mühlenbach (German pronunciation: [ˈmyːlənbax]) is a small river of North Rhine-Westphalia, Germany. It is a right tributary of the Werre in Löhne.

== See also ==
- List of rivers of North Rhine-Westphalia
