= Pfreimd =

- Town
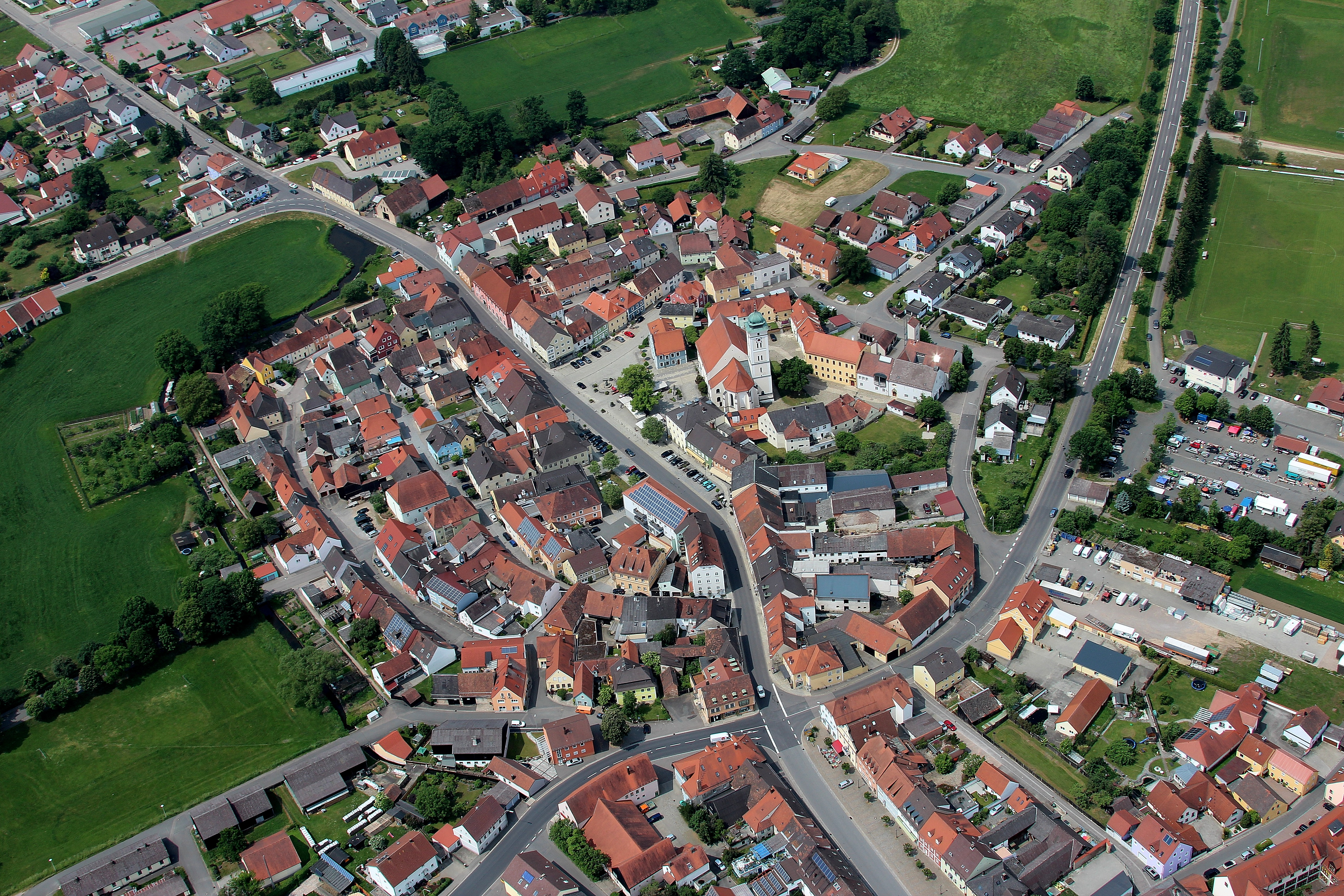
- Aerial view

- Coat of arms

- Location of Pfreimd within Schwandorf district
- Interactive map of Pfreimd
- Location within Germany Location within Bavaria
- Coordinates: 49°30′N 12°11′E
- Country: Germany
- State: Bavaria
- Admin. region: Oberpfalz
- District: Schwandorf
- Municipal assoc.: Pfreimd
- Subdivisions: 10 Ortsteile

Government
  - Mayor (2020–26): Richard Tischler (FW)

Area
  - Total: 51.45 km^{2} (19.86 sq mi)
- Elevation: 372 m (1,220 ft)

Population (2025-12-31)
  - Total: 4,965
  - Density: 96.50/km^{2} (249.9/sq mi)
- Time zone: UTC+01:00 (CET)
  - Summer (DST): UTC+02:00 (CEST)
- Postal codes: 92536
- Dialling codes: 0 96 06
- Vehicle registration: SAD
- Website: www.pfreimd.de

Pfreimd (German pronunciation: [pfʁaɪmt]) is a town in the district of Schwandorf, in Bavaria, Germany. It is situated on the river Naab, 19 km north of Schwandorf, and 20 km south of Weiden in der Oberpfalz. It is also close to the border with the Czech Republic.

== Mayor ==
Arnold Kimmerl (ÖDP) (Ecological Democratic Party) won the election in 2008. In 2014, Richard Tischler (Free Voters) won the election, and again in 2020.
