= Trausnitz =

- Municipality
- Coat of arms

- Location of Trausnitz within Schwandorf district
- Interactive map of Trausnitz
- Location within Germany Location within Bavaria
- Coordinates: 49°31′N 12°16′E
- Country: Germany
- State: Bavaria
- Admin. region: Oberpfalz
- District: Schwandorf
- Municipal assoc.: Pfreimd
- Subdivisions: 9 Ortsteile

Government
  - Mayor (2020–26): Martin Schwandner

Area
  - Total: 17.63 km^{2} (6.81 sq mi)
- Elevation: 448 m (1,470 ft)

Population (2025-12-31)
  - Total: 883
  - Density: 50.1/km^{2} (130/sq mi)
- Time zone: UTC+01:00 (CET)
  - Summer (DST): UTC+02:00 (CEST)
- Postal codes: 92555
- Dialling codes: 0 96 55
- Vehicle registration: SAD
- Website: www.trausnitz.de

Trausnitz (German pronunciation: [ˈtʁaʊsnɪts]) is a municipality in the district of Schwandorf in Bavaria, Germany.
