= Mühlebach =

Mühlebach may refer to:

- Mühlebach (Ernen), a locality in the municipality of Ernen, Valais, Switzerland
- Mühlebach (Grindelwald), a locality in the municipality of Grindelwald, Bern, Switzerland
- Mühlebach (Zürich), a quarter in the district 8 of the city of Zürich, Switzerland
