= Mühlbach (Isar-Werkkanal) =

Stream in Germany

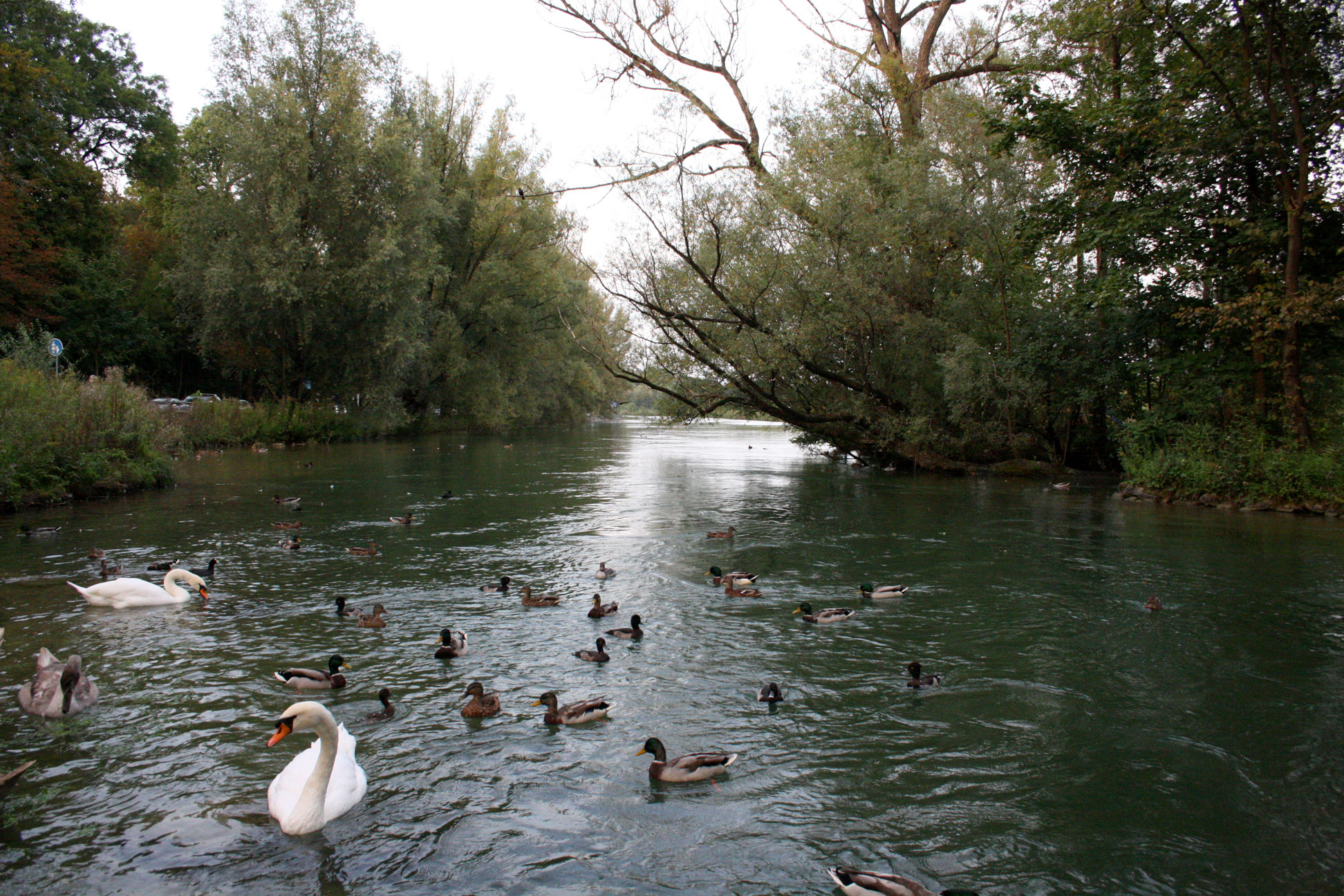
- The Mühlbach in Munich shortly before flowing into the Isar-Werkkanal

Location
- Country: Germany
- States: Bavaria

Physical characteristics
- Source
  - location: 48.0865°N 11.5410°E
- Mouth
  - location: 48.0970°N 11.5458°E

The Mühlbach is a small stream in Munich-Thalkirchen, Bavaria, Germany. It is a branch of the Isar, which in turn flows into the Danube.

== See also ==
- List of rivers of Bavaria
