= Johann Nepomuk von Ringseis =

German physician

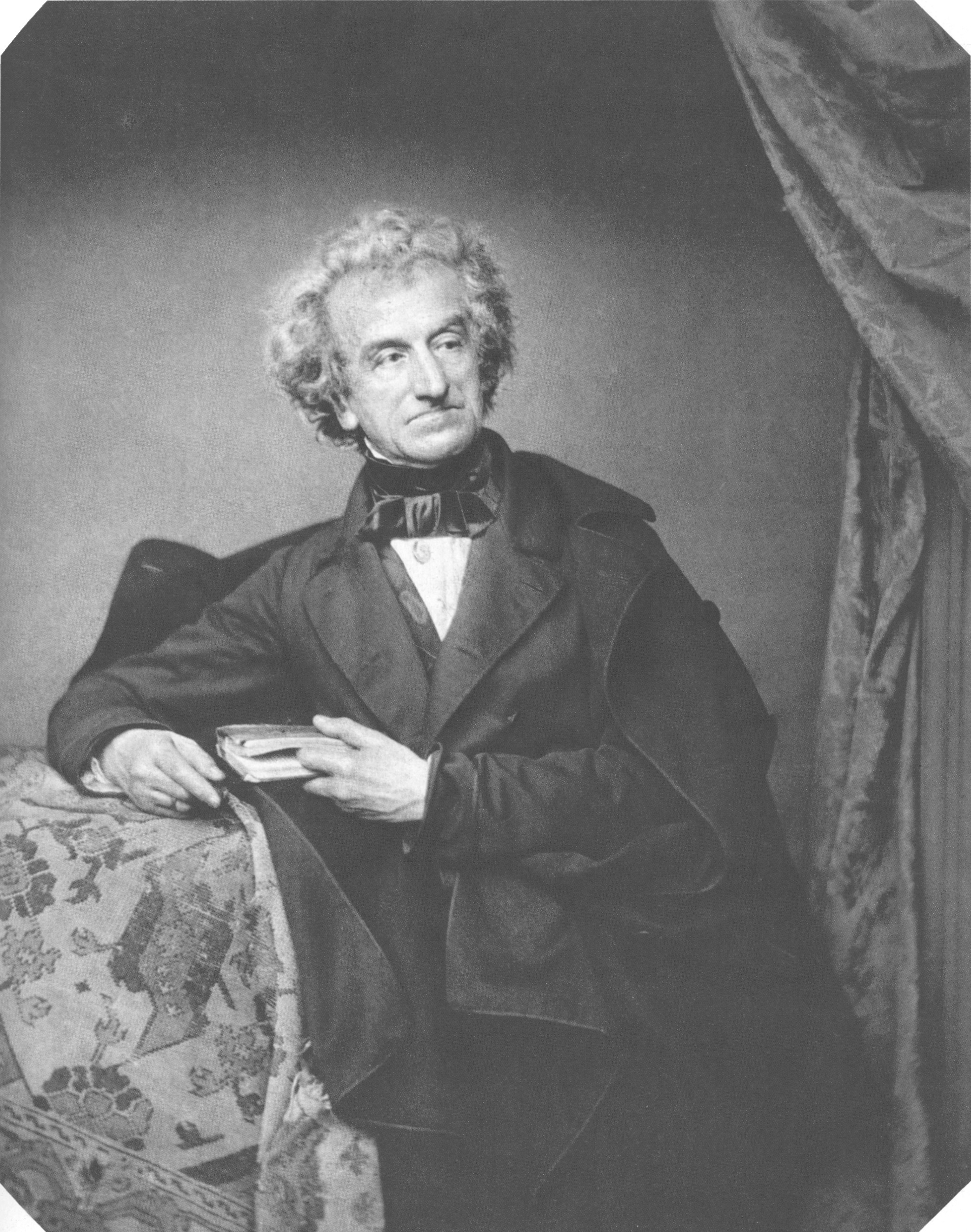
- Born: 16 May 1785; Schwarzhofen, Oberpfalz
- Died: 22 May 1880 (aged 95); Munich
- Education: University of Landshut
- Occupation: Physician

Johann Nepomuk von Ringseis (16 May 1785 – 22 May 1880) was a German medical doctor born in Schwarzhofen, Oberpfalz.

He received his education at the University of Landshut, where he was a student of Andreas Röschlaub (1768-1835). Afterwards he furthered his studies in Vienna (1812–1813) and Berlin (1814–1815), and in 1816 moved to Munich as a personal physician to Crown Prince Ludwig. In 1818, he was appointed Medizinalrat (medical health officer) to the district of Isarkreis. In 1826, he became a professor at the Medical Faculty of the Ludwig-Maximilians-Universität München.

Ringseis took a religious approach towards medicine, and believed that the origin of disease was rooted in "original sin". Among his written works was System der Medizin, a publication involving his lectures on general pathology and therapy.

He died on 22 May 1880 in Munich.
