= Silberhütte =

Silberhütte is German for "silver works" and may refer to:

- Silberhütte (Harzgerode), a village in the borough of Harzgerode in the Harz Mountains of Germany
- Silberhütte (Braunlage), a village in the borough of Sankt Andreasberg in the Harz Mountains of Germany
- Langlaufzentrum Silberhütte, a cross-country skiing centre in the Upper Palatine Forest in Germany
