= Jakob Weiseborn =

Jakob Weiseborn (22 March 1892 in Frankfurt – 20 January 1939 in Flossenbürg) was a German SS-Sturmbannführer (major) and the first commandant of Flossenbürg concentration camp.

== Life ==
Jakob Weiseborn served in the navy for 18 years. He joined the NSDAP (no. 753,119) and SS (no. 17,063). After the Machtergreifung, he was first employed in the guard unit at Dachau concentration camp as of January 1935 and, following a disciplinary transfer, at Esterwegen concentration camp from the end of 1935. In April 1936, Weiseborn took over the post of Schutzhaftlagerführer from Karl d'Angelo in Dachau. From late 1936 until July 1937, he served as Schutzhaftlagerführer in Sachsenhausen concentration camp and then as second Schutzhaftlagerführer in Buchenwald concentration camp. A Buchenwald survivor recalls that he "often punched inmates in the face or kicked them in the belly with his boot." At the prisoner barracks in Buchenwald the following sentence was written: "In his anger God created Hauptsturmführer Weiseborn."

Weiseborn, a chronic alcoholic, became the first commandant of Flossenbürg concentration camp beginning in May 1938 and remained so until January 1939. On 20 January 1939 in Flossenbürg, Weiseborn committed suicide by drinking poison in his room, perhaps due to an investigation of his embezzlement at Buchenwald.

== Bibliography ==
- Tom Segev. Soldiers of Evil: The Commandants of the Nazi Concentration Camps. 1988, ISBN 0-07-056058-7
- Ernst Klee. Das Personenlexikon zum Dritten Reich. Fischer-Taschenbuch-Verlag, Frankfurt am Main, 2005, ISBN 3-596-16048-0
- Holm Kirsten, Wulf Kirsten. Stimmen aus Buchenwald. Ein Lesebuch. Wallstein Verlag, Göttingen 2002, ISBN 3-89244-574-5

Military offices
Preceded by None	Commandant of Flossenbürg concentration camp May 1938 – 20 January 1939	Succeeded by SS-Obersturmbannführer Karl Künstler
