= Karl Künstler =

German SS officer

- Born: 12 January 1901; Zella, Anrode
- Died: April 1945 (aged 44); Nuremberg
- Military career
- Allegiance: Germany
- Branch: SS
- Rank: Obersturmbannführer (lieutenant colonel)
- Service number: 40,005
- Other work: Commandant of Flossenbürg concentration camp

Karl Künstler (12 January 1901 – presumably April 1945) was a German SS-Obersturmbannführer and commandant of Flossenbürg concentration camp.

== Life ==
Künstler, whose father was a barber, worked at a post office in Kassel in 1915, against the wishes of his parents, after completing school. From 1919, he was a Berufssoldat (professional soldier) and served for 12 years in the Reichswehr, where he attended the Heeresfachschule für Verwaltung und Wirtschaft (Army Technical School of Management and Economics) in addition to various training courses. His marriage in 1929 resulted in two children. Künstler, who rose in the Reichswehr to the rank of Feldwebel, retired from the military in 1931. In 1931, he joined the SS (member no. 40,005) and then also the Nazi Party (member no. 1,238,648). From 1931, he served full-time in the SS. From 1934 to 1935, he was assigned to the SS-Verfügungstruppe in Jüterbog and then briefly to the SS-Totenkopfverbände Brandenburg. After completing a course at the SS-Junkerschule Bad Tölz in 1936, he was transferred to the SS-Totenkopfstandarte Oberbayern and rose to become its commander in December 1939.

== Concentration camp commandant ==
In January 1939, Künstler became commandant at Flossenbürg concentration camp after the previous commandant Jakob Weiseborn had committed suicide on 20 January 1939. Under Künstler, who was regarded as arbitrary, the death toll skyrocketed. In addition, he was responsible for mass executions of Polish and Soviet prisoners, introduced a special two-week holiday for the guards, and also shot prisoners on the run.

In August 1942, Künstler was relieved from his post as commandant of the camp by Oswald Pohl. He was succeeded for two months by his deputy, Schutzhaftlagerführer Karl Fritzsch, before Egon Zill was appointed camp commandant. The reasons for Künstler's dismissal as camp commandant lay in his debauchery and his chronic alcohol abuse. Künstler, like other concentration camp commandants and personnel, was caught in the sights of SS judge Georg Konrad Morgen, who prosecuted corruption in the concentration camps. After that, he was demoted to the 7th SS Volunteer Mountain Division Prinz Eugen and probably died in the Battle of Nuremberg in April 1945. Künstler was declared dead in Erlangen in 1949.

== Bibliography ==
- Karin Orth: Die Konzentrationslager-SS. dtv, Munich 2004, ISBN 3-423-34085-1
- Tom Segev. Soldiers of Evil: The Commandants of the Nazi Concentration Camps. 1988, ISBN 0-07-056058-7
- Karin Orth: Das System der nationalsozialistischen Konzentrationslager. Pendo Verlag, Hamburg 2002, ISBN 3-85-842-450-1
- Ernst Klee. Das Personenlexikon zum Dritten Reich. Fischer-Taschenbuch-Verlag, Frankfurt am Main, 2005, ISBN 3-596-16048-0

Military offices
Preceded by SS-Sturmbannführer Jakob Weiseborn	Commandant of Flossenbürg concentration camp January 1939 – August 1942	Succeeded by SS-Hauptsturmführer Karl Fritzsch
