= Neunburg vorm Wald (Verwaltungsgemeinschaft) =

- Verwaltungsgemeinschaft
- Location of Neunburg vorm Wald within Schwandorf district
- Interactive map of Neunburg vorm Wald
- Location within Germany Location within Bavaria
- Coordinates: 49°23′N 12°21′E
- Country: Germany
- State: Bavaria
- Admin. region: Upper Palatinate
- District: Schwandorf
- Seat: Neunburg vorm Wald
- Subdivisions: 4 municipalities

Area
  - Total: 136.37 km^{2} (52.65 sq mi)

Population (2025-12-31)
  - Total: 4,431
  - Density: 32.49/km^{2} (84.16/sq mi)
- Time zone: UTC+01:00 (CET)
  - Summer (DST): UTC+02:00 (CEST)
- Website: www.vg-neunburg.de

Neunburg vorm Wald is a Verwaltungsgemeinschaft (municipal association) in the district of Schwandorf in Bavaria, Germany. Its seat is in Neunburg vorm Wald, itself not part of the Verwaltungsgemeinschaft.

It consists of the following municipalities:

1. Dieterskirchen
2. Neukirchen-Balbini
3. Schwarzhofen
4. Thanstein
