= Dieterskirchen =

- Municipality
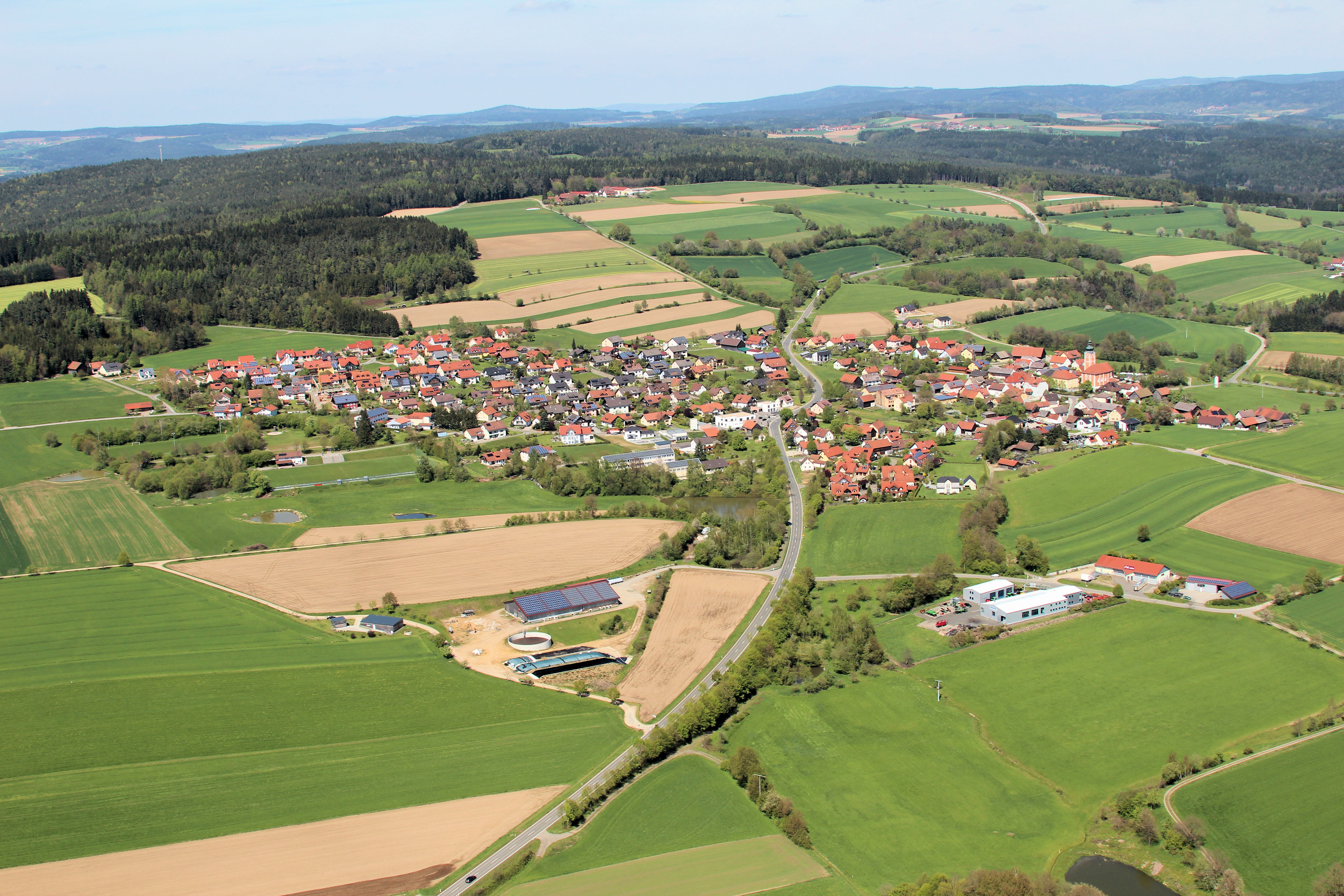
- Dieterskirchen in 2017

- Coat of arms

- Location of Dieterskirchen within Schwandorf district
- Interactive map of Dieterskirchen
- Location within Germany Location within Bavaria
- Coordinates: 49°25′N 12°25′E
- Country: Germany
- State: Bavaria
- Admin. region: Oberpfalz
- District: Schwandorf
- Municipal assoc.: Neunburg vorm Wald

Government
  - Mayor (2020–26): Anita Forster (CSU)

Area
  - Total: 24.14 km^{2} (9.32 sq mi)
- Elevation: 499 m (1,637 ft)

Population (2025-12-31)
  - Total: 987
  - Density: 40.9/km^{2} (106/sq mi)
- Time zone: UTC+01:00 (CET)
  - Summer (DST): UTC+02:00 (CEST)
- Postal codes: 92542
- Dialling codes: 0 96 71
- Vehicle registration: SAD
- Website: www.dieterskirchen.de

Dieterskirchen (German pronunciation: [diːtɐsˈkɪʁçn̩]) is a municipality in the district of Schwandorf in Bavaria, Germany.

== Neighbouring communities ==
The neighbouring communities clockwise: Oberviechtach, Winklarn, Thanstein, Neunburg vorm Wald, Schwarzhofen and Niedermurach.

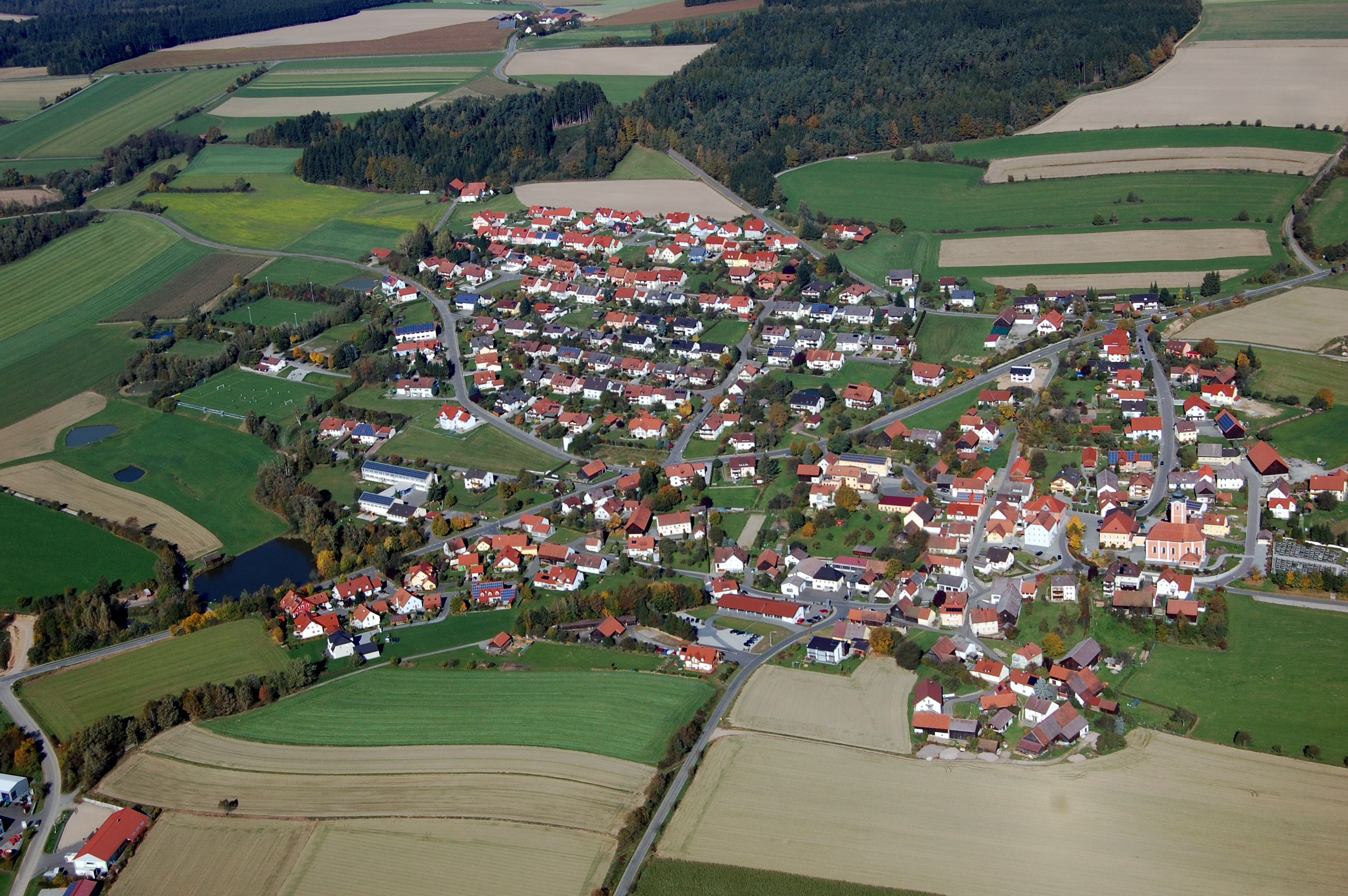
Dieterskirchen in 2010

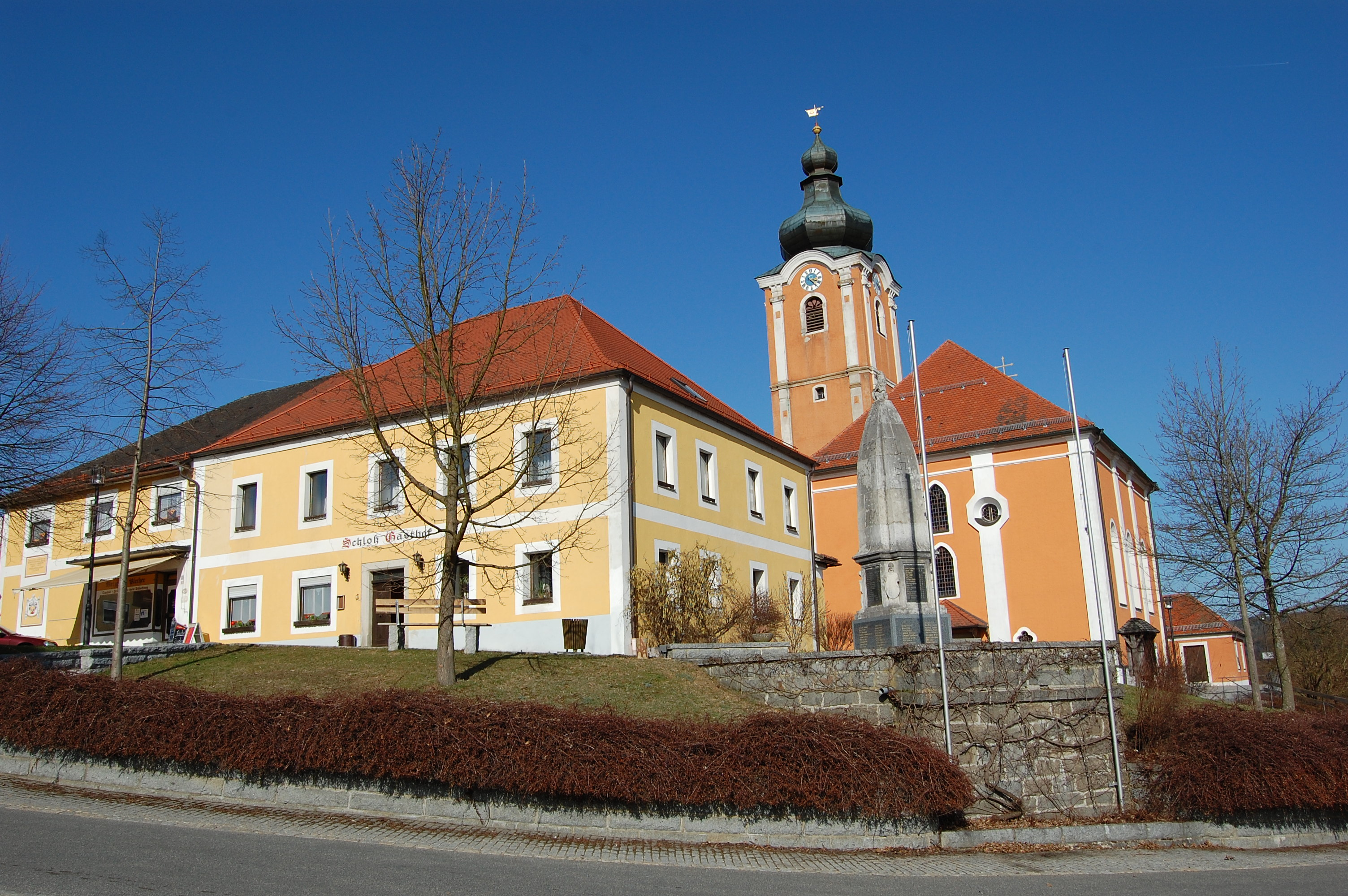
Dieterskirchen Castle
