= Flossenbürg, Bavaria =

Flossenbürg
- Municipality
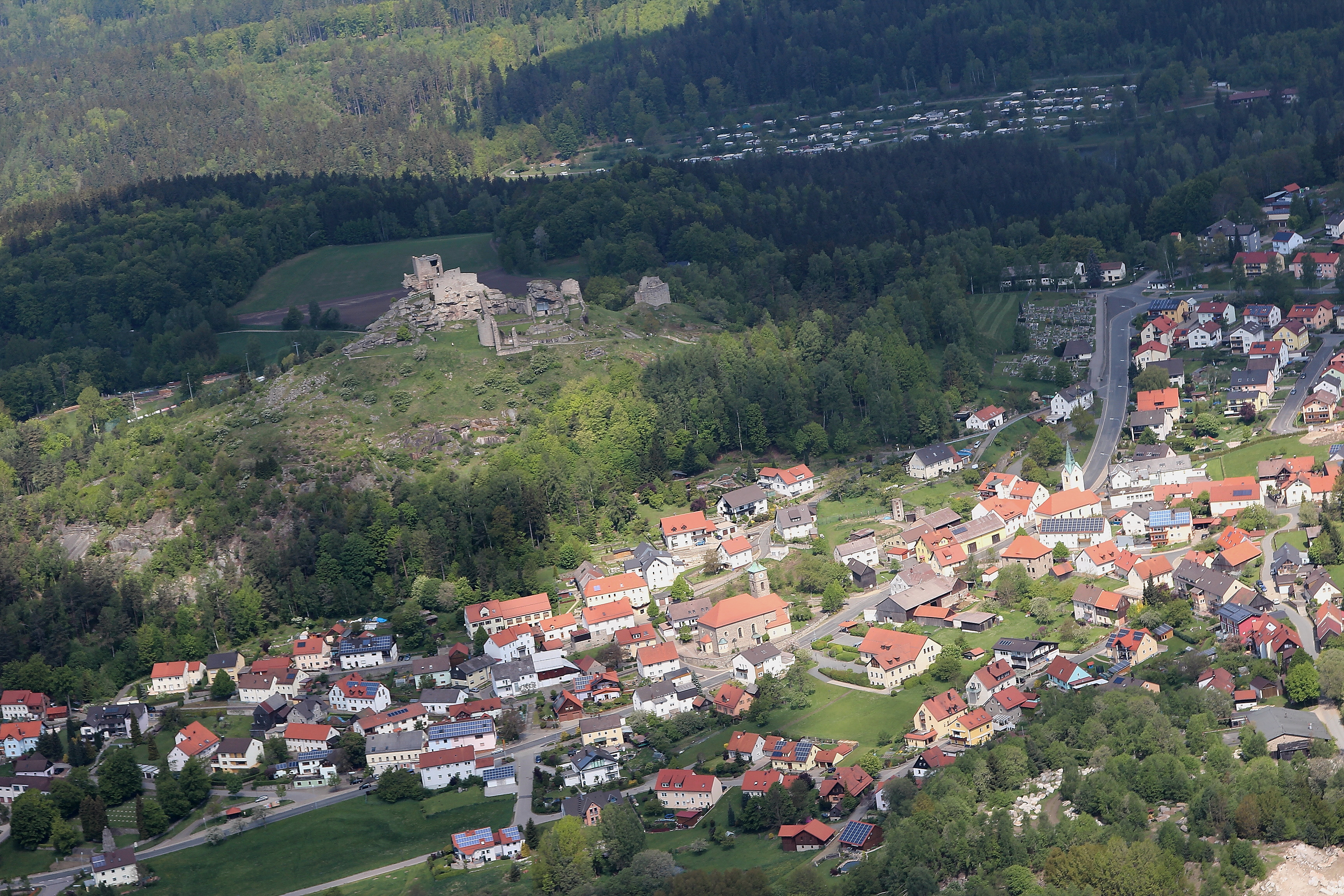

- Coat of arms

- Location of Flossenbürg within Neustadt a.d.Waldnaab district
- Interactive map of Flossenbürg
- Location within Germany Location within Bavaria
- Coordinates: 49°44′9″N 12°20′55″E
- Country: Germany
- State: Bavaria
- Admin. region: Upper Palatinate
- District: Neustadt a.d.Waldnaab
- Subdivisions: 16 Ortsteile

Government
  - Mayor (2020–26): Thomas Meiler (CSU)

Area
  - Total: 23.26 km^{2} (8.98 sq mi)
- Elevation: 644 m (2,113 ft)

Population (2025-12-31)
  - Total: 1,478
  - Density: 63.54/km^{2} (164.6/sq mi)
- Time zone: UTC+01:00 (CET)
  - Summer (DST): UTC+02:00 (CEST)
- Postal codes: 92696
- Dialling codes: 09603, 09636
- Vehicle registration: NEW
- Website: www.flossenbuerg.de

Flossenbürg (Northern Bavarian: Flossenbirch) is a municipality in the district of Neustadt an der Waldnaab in Bavaria in Germany. The state-approved leisure area is located in the Bavarian Forest and borders Bohemia (the Czech Republic) in the east. During World War II, the Flossenbürg concentration camp was located here.

== History ==
The first reference of Flossenbürg's existence was in 948. Its castle was the Hohenstaufen's stronghold. Later, Flossenbürg belonged to the duchy of Neuburg-Sulzbach and came to the regional court of Floß in the Electorate of Bavaria in 1777. Today, it is located in the administrative region of Oberpfalz.

The town was the site of Flossenbürg concentration camp from 1938 until 1945. On 23 April 1945, the U.S. 90th Infantry Division of the 3rd Army liberated the camp and took it without any fighting.

== Transport ==
Flossenbürg was the terminus of the Floß–Flossenbürg railway line that branched off in Floß from the Neustadt (Waldnaab)–Eslarn railway and is served today by a bus route from Weiden via Neustadt an der Waldnaab to the Silberhütte Cross-Country Skiing Centre.

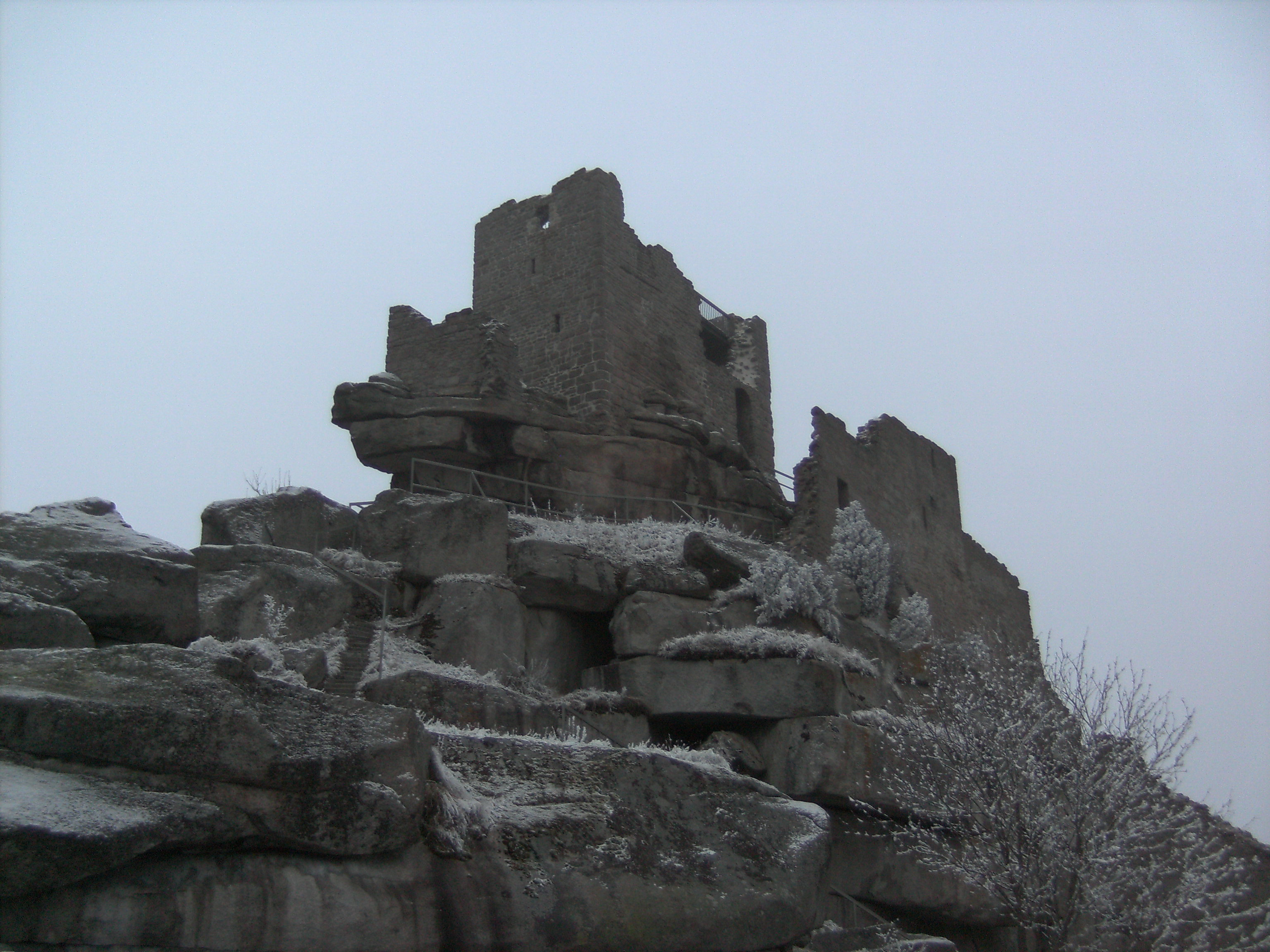
Fortified house, the topmost and oldest part of Flossenbürg Castle.

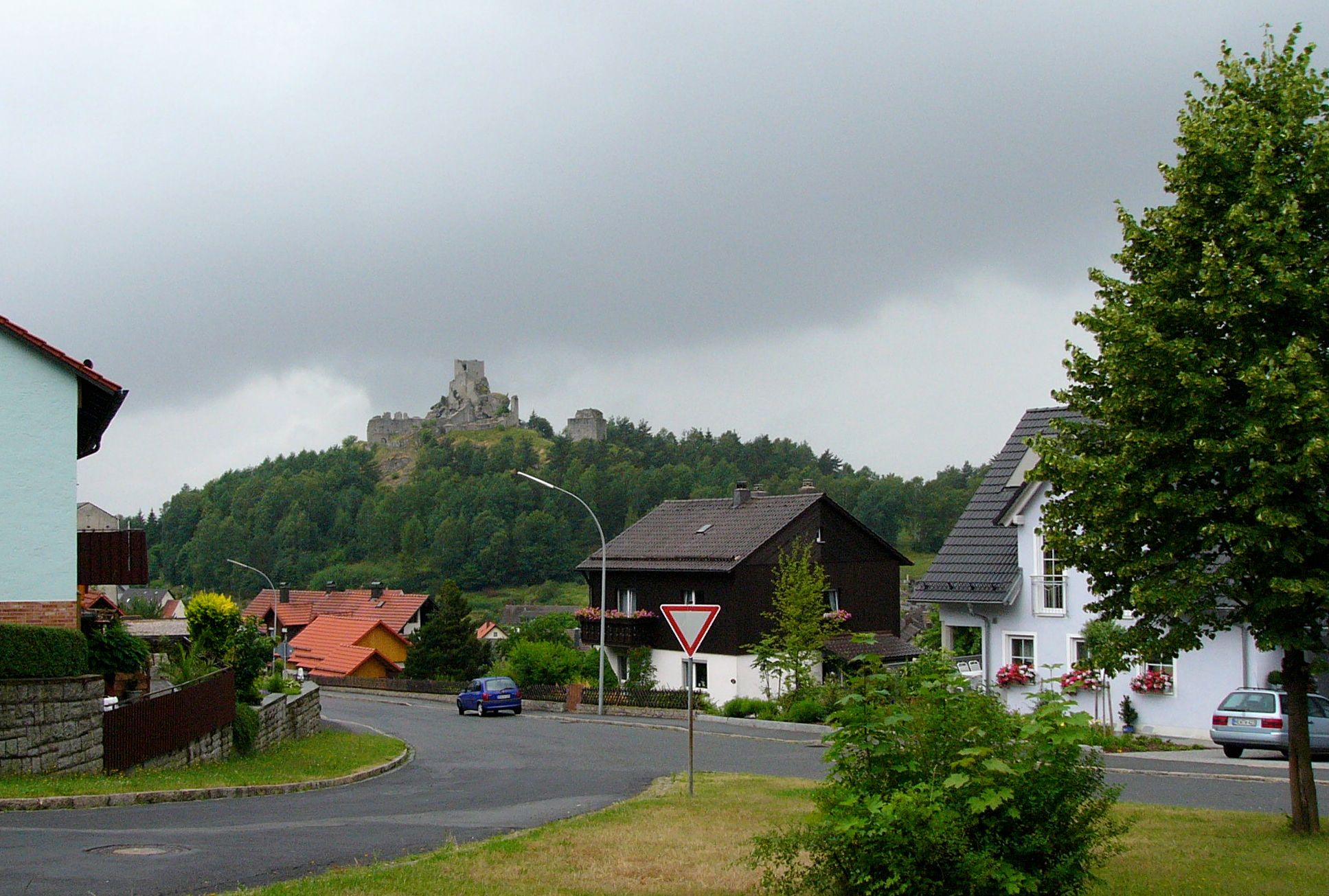
Flossenbürg seen from north - west. In the background there is the castle.
