= Thanstein =

- Municipality
- Coat of arms

- Location of Thanstein within Schwandorf district
- Interactive map of Thanstein
- Location within Germany Location within Bavaria
- Coordinates: 49°23′N 12°28′E
- Country: Germany
- State: Bavaria
- Admin. region: Oberpfalz
- District: Schwandorf
- Municipal assoc.: Neunburg vorm Wald

Government
  - Mayor (2020–26): Walter Schauer

Area
  - Total: 27.85 km^{2} (10.75 sq mi)
- Elevation: 545 m (1,788 ft)

Population (2025-12-31)
  - Total: 928
  - Density: 33.3/km^{2} (86.3/sq mi)
- Time zone: UTC+01:00 (CET)
  - Summer (DST): UTC+02:00 (CEST)
- Postal codes: 92554
- Dialling codes: 0 82 81
- Vehicle registration: SAD
- Website: www.thanstein.de

Thanstein is a municipality in the district of Schwandorf in Bavaria, Germany.
