= Schwarzhofen =

- Municipality
- Coat of arms

- Location of Schwarzhofen within Schwandorf district
- Interactive map of Schwarzhofen
- Location within Germany Location within Bavaria
- Coordinates: 49°23′N 12°21′E
- Country: Germany
- State: Bavaria
- Admin. region: Oberpfalz
- District: Schwandorf
- Municipal assoc.: Neunburg vorm Wald

Government
  - Mayor (2020–26): Maximilian Beer (CSU)

Area
  - Total: 36.11 km^{2} (13.94 sq mi)
- Elevation: 382 m (1,253 ft)

Population (2025-12-31)
  - Total: 1,364
  - Density: 37.77/km^{2} (97.83/sq mi)
- Time zone: UTC+01:00 (CET)
  - Summer (DST): UTC+02:00 (CEST)
- Postal codes: 92447
- Dialling codes: 09672
- Vehicle registration: SAD
- Website: www.schwarzhofen.de

Schwarzhofen (German pronunciation: [ʃvaʁtsˈhoːfn̩]) is a municipality in the district of Schwandorf in Bavaria, Germany.

== Climate ==
Schwarzhofen

Climate chart (precipitation, max. and min. temperature)
J	F	M	A	M	J	J	A	S	O	N	D
107 −4 −8	60 −2 −7	31 7 −1	56 16 4	124 19 9	106 24 12	96 23 14	119 22 12	85 20 8	84 12 6	74 3 −2	95 −3 −7
- █ Average max. and min. temperatures in °C
- █ Precipitation totals in mm
Imperial conversion
J	F	M	A	M	J	J	A	S	O	N	D
4.2 25 18	2.4 28 19	1.2 45 30	2.2 61 39	4.9 66 48	4.2 75 54	3.8 73 57	4.7 72 54	3.3 68 46	3.3 54 43	2.9 37 28	3.7 27 19
- █ Average max. and min. temperatures in °F
- █ Precipitation totals in inches

== Neighbouring communities ==
The neighbouring communities clockwise: Niedermurach, Dieterskirchen, Neunburg vorm Wald, Altendorf.

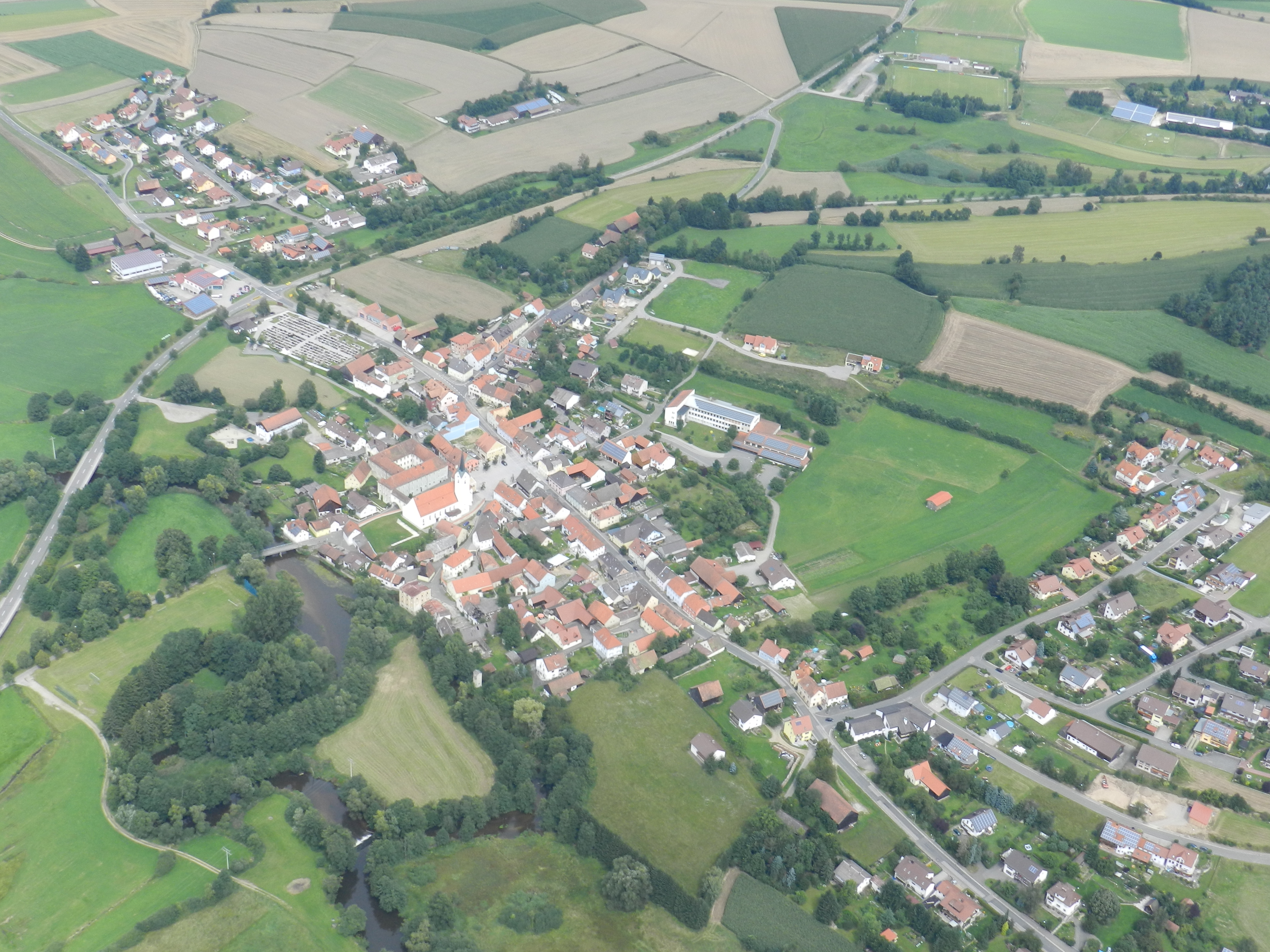
Schwarzhofen (2011)

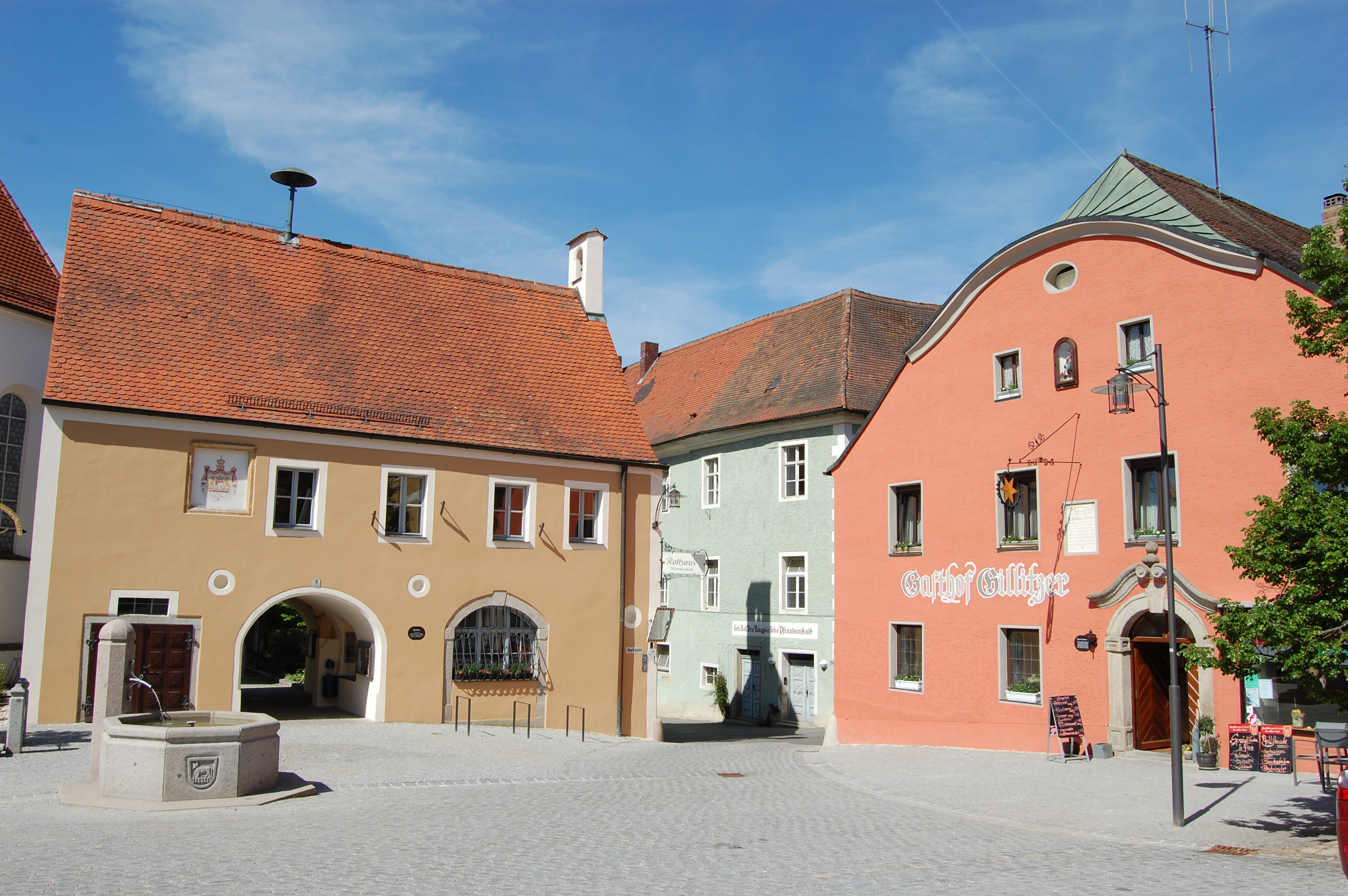
Market-Place Schwarzhofen
