= Langlaufzentrum Silberhütte =

Skiing centre in Upper Palatinate, Germany

The Langlaufzentrum Silberhütte is a cross-country skiing centre in the northern part of the Upper Palatine Forest in Germany and belongs to the town of Bärnau and district of Tirschenreuth. One feature is that, due to its location immediately on the border with the Czech Republic the langlauf trails cross the national border. The cross-country skiing centre has a total of 50 km of trails plus 9 km of skating track at heights of between 750 and 901 m above sea level. At the start of the trails is a restaurant and a waxing hut.
