= List of memorials related to the Wackersdorf reprocessing plant =

List of WAA memorials

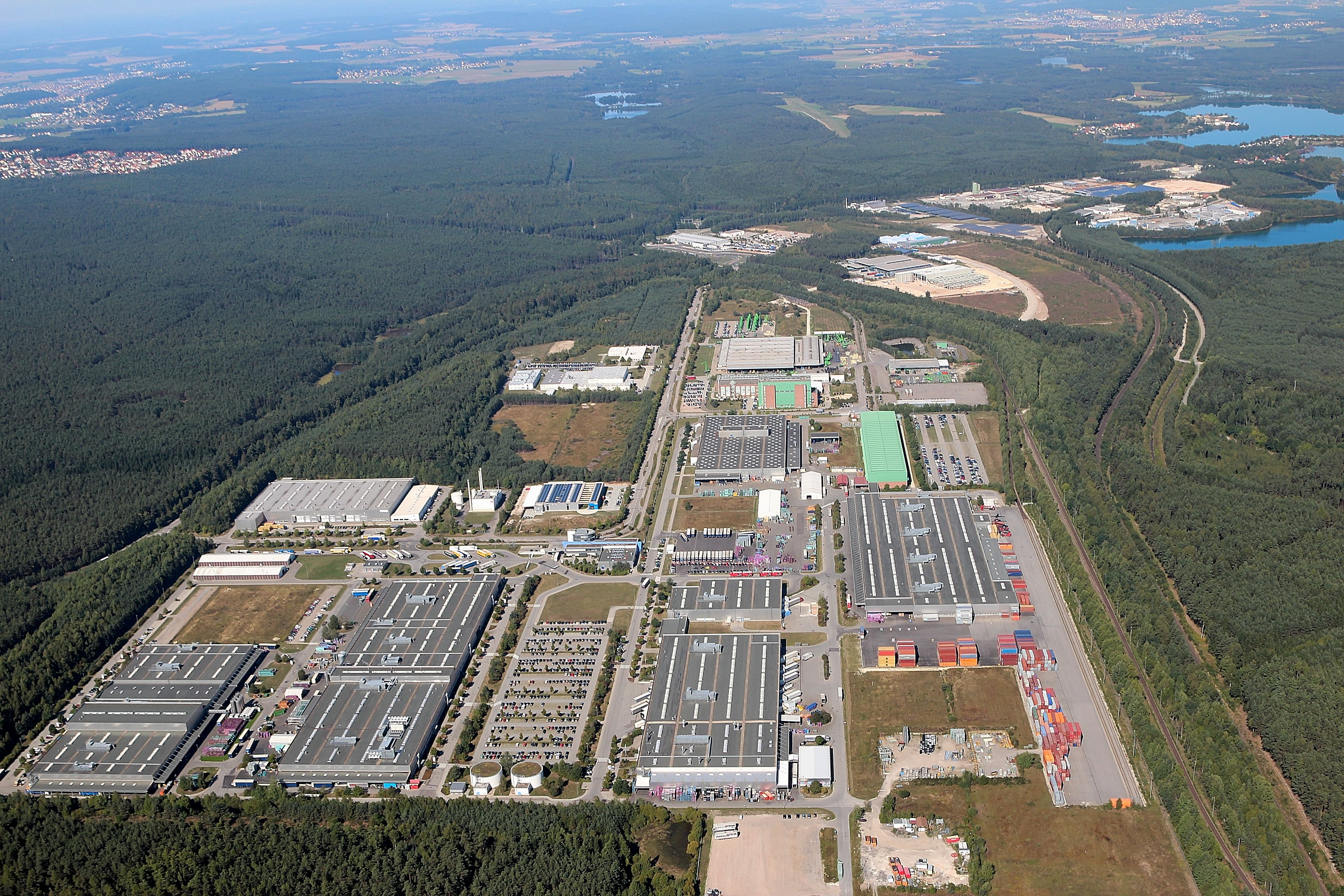
Industrial area with WAA buildings

Many memorials and monuments were erected in Bavaria and Austria to commemorate the construction of and resistance against the Wackersdorf nuclear reprocessing plant (WAA). The production and erection of some monuments even during the conflict was initially a "performative act of protest," but also fulfilled practical functions, such as the wayside shrine Franziskus-Marterl.

== WAA Wackersdorf buildings ==
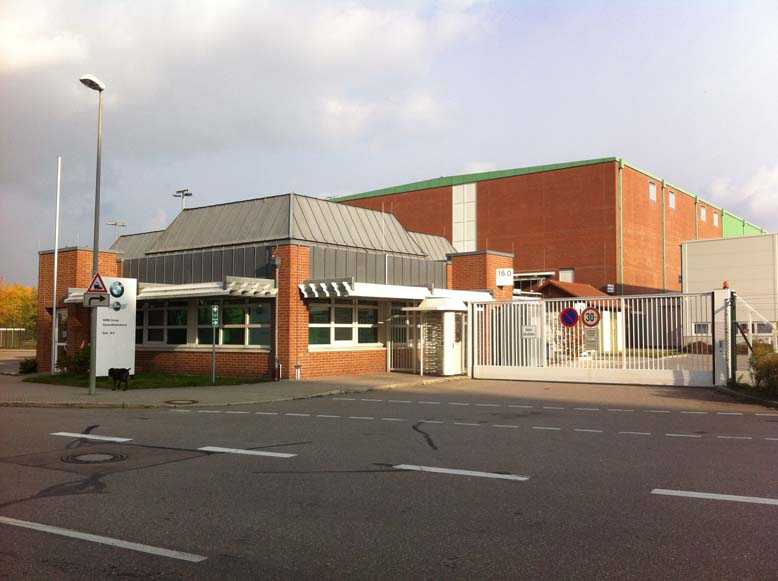
Fuel element receiving storage facility (BMW today)

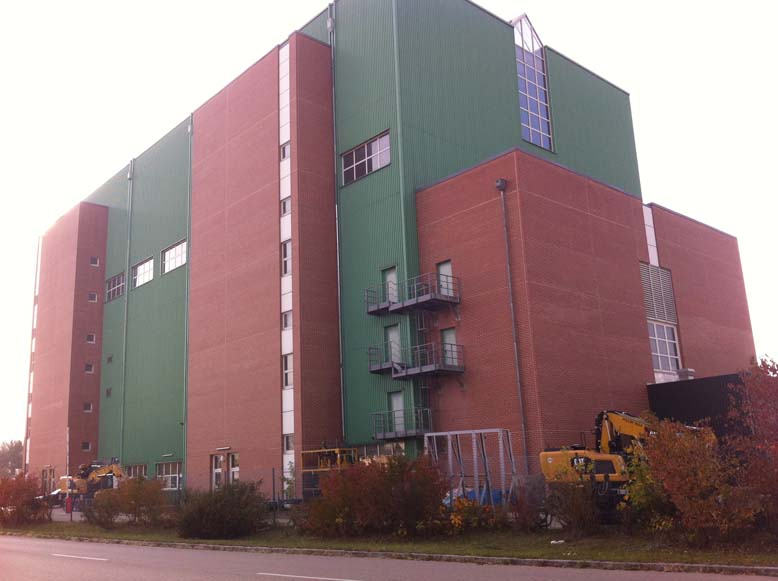
Module test stand building

After the WAA project was abandoned, an industrial park was built on the former WAA construction site. The green-colored WAA buildings (module test stand, fuel element receiving storage, and workshops) are used by companies such as BMW and Caterpillar. (more photos)

== Franziskus-Marterl ==
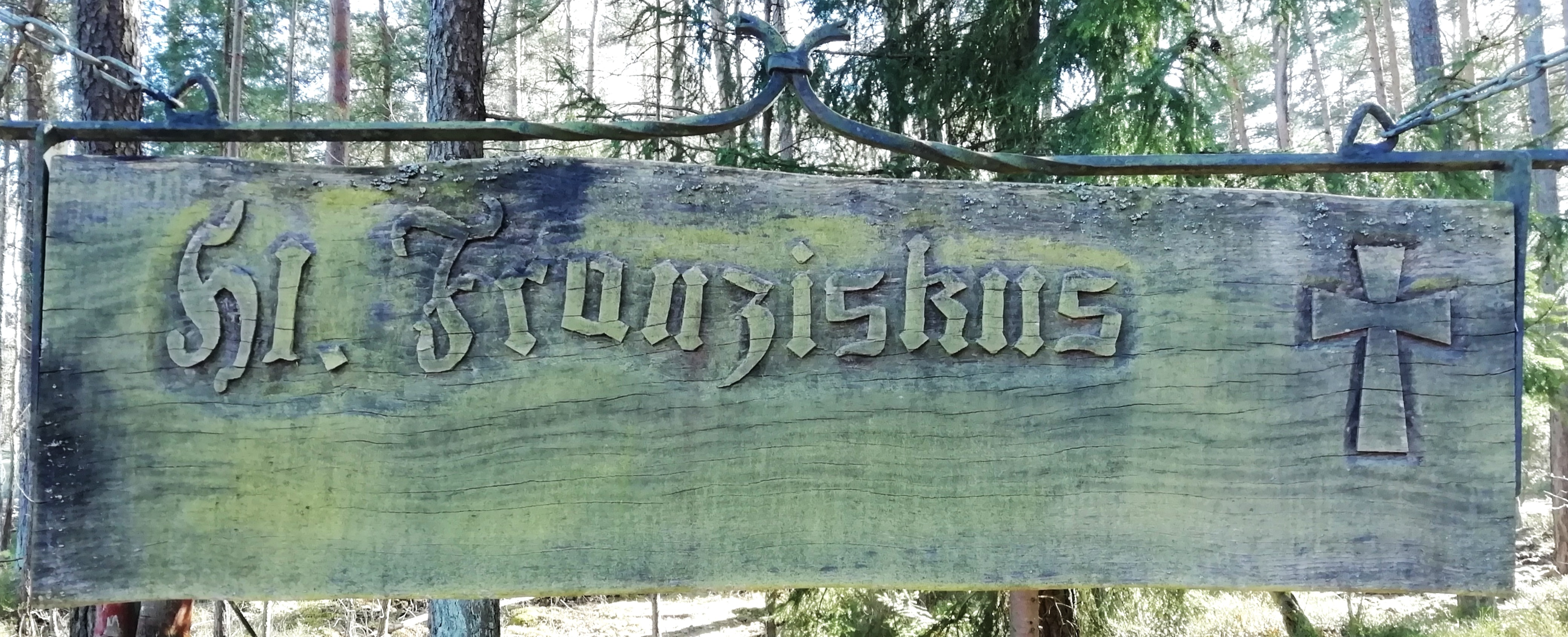
Saint Francis - we all thank you

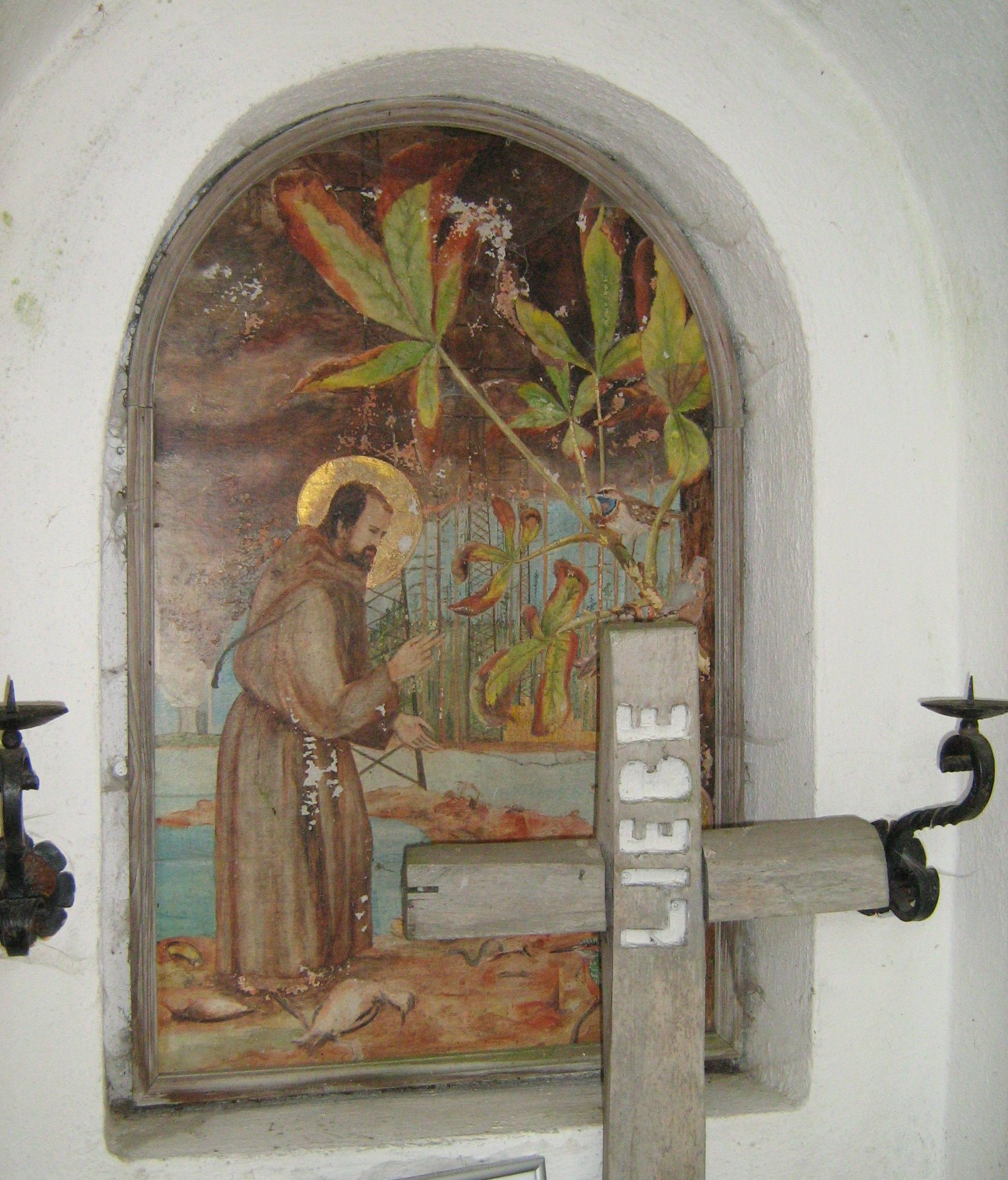
St. Francis scene (Sermon to the Birds) by Berndt Trepesch

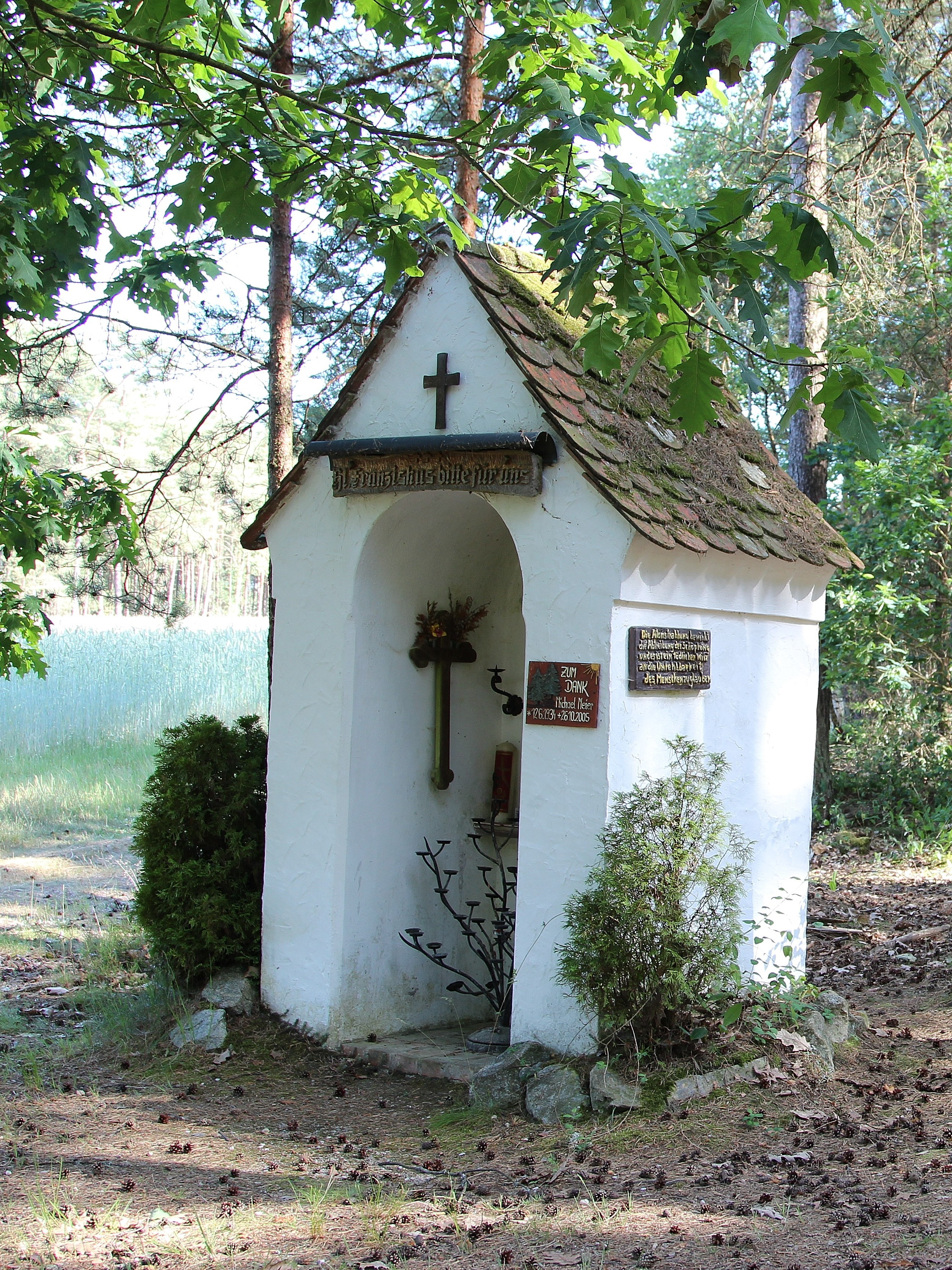
Franziskus-Marterl

The Franziskus-Marterl (erected in 1984) is a chapel-shrine in the southeast of the unfinished Wackersdorf reprocessing plant (WAA) "Im Blaubeerwald" in Altenschwand-Bodenwöhr (Schwandorf district, Bavaria). The WAA resistance marterl is dedicated to Francis of Assisi and is surrounded by several other protest monuments. The "Franziskus-Marterl" is a stone reminder of the fight against the reprocessing plant. (more photos)
Inscriptions:

St. Francis pray for us[7]

Nuclear radiation is causing the abortion of creation, and it is a deadly joke to believe in human infallibility.[8]

== Stolen Cross of Wackersdorf ==
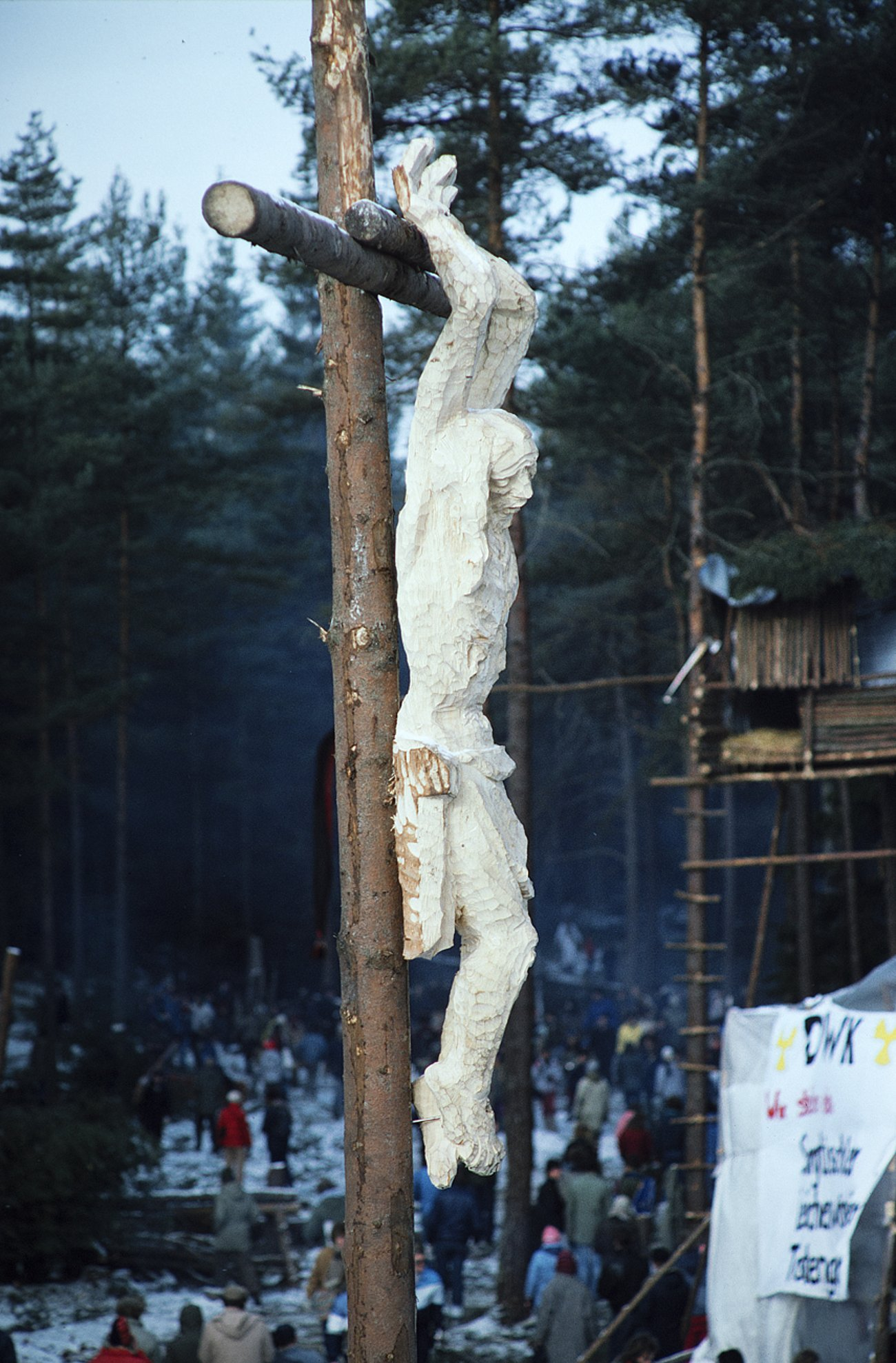
Village cross in Wackerland

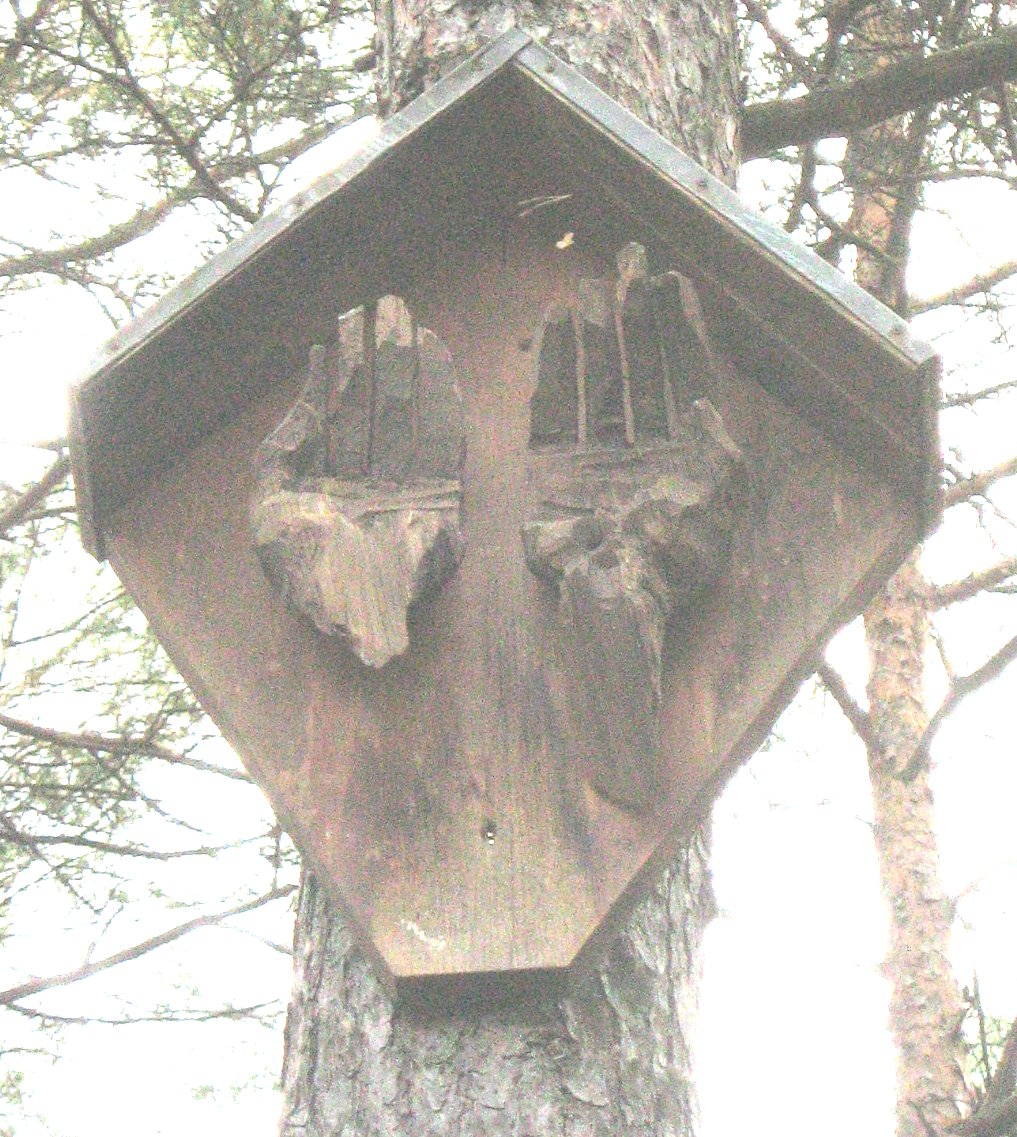
Stolen Cross of Wackersdorf

From December 26 to 29, 1985, wood sculptor Stefan Preisl carved a 1.60 m tall figure of Christ in the anti-nuclear power plant (WAA) Hut village Free Republic of Wackerland. This was attached to a ten-meter-high cross. The consecrated crucifix stood for only one week. During the clearing of the hut village on January 7, 1986, the police sawed off the crucifix and removed it. The Christ figure, returned shortly afterward, was then attached to a tree near the Franziskus-Marterl. On the night of February 20, 1986, the Christ figure disappeared. Only the broken-off hands remain, hanging next to the Cross of Wackersdorf today. (more photos)

== Cross of Wackersdorf ==
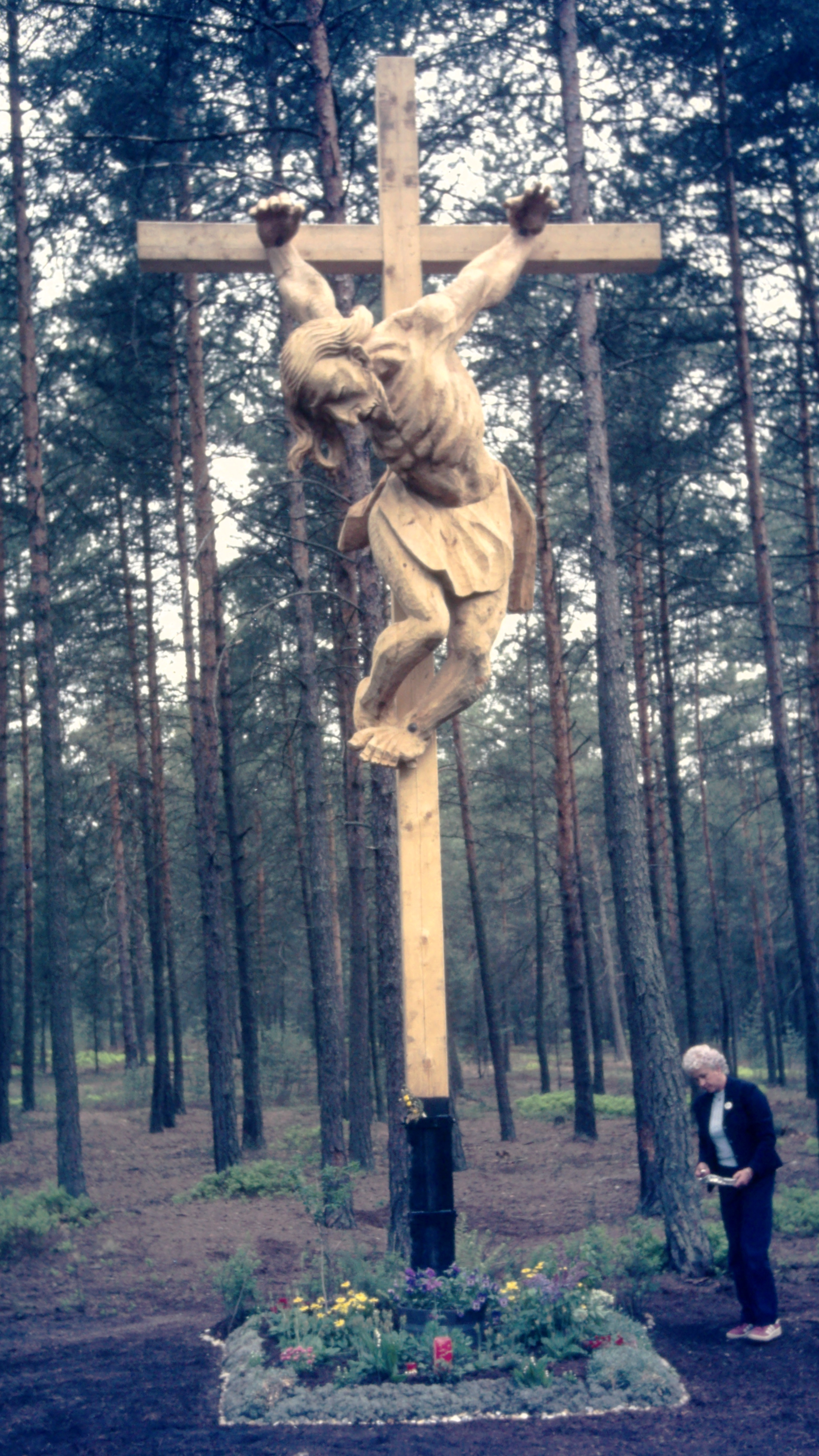
Cross of Wackersdorf (1986)

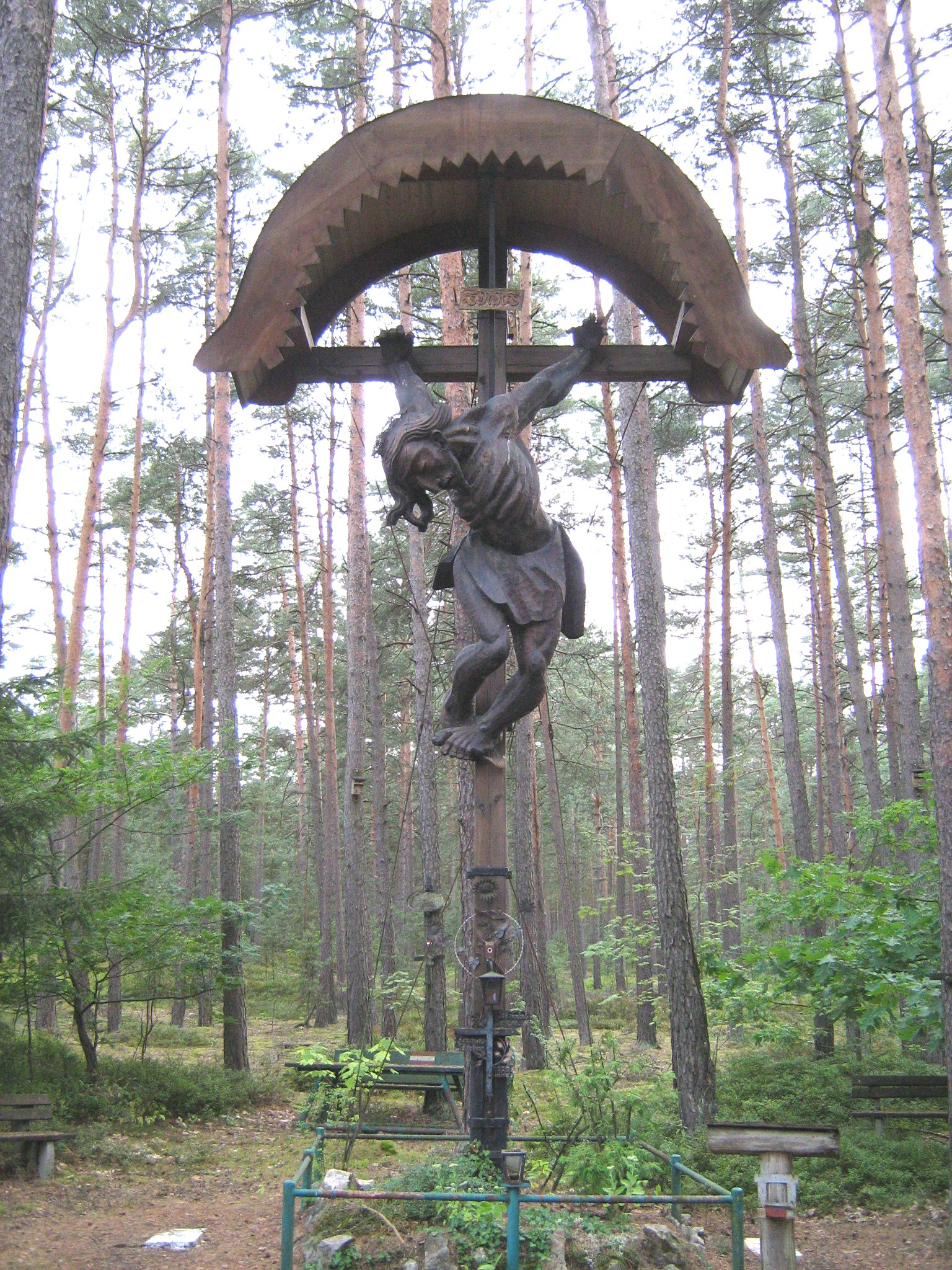
Cross of Wackersdorf

The seven-meter-high "Cross of Wackersdorf" was created in 1986 by Stefan Preisl from Weymouth pine. On Easter Sunday 1986, when 100,000 people demonstrated in the Easter March to Wackersdorf, the crucifix was erected next to the Franziskus-Marterl. After the WAA construction halt, unknown persons placed a crown of thorns made of razor wire from the Wackersdorf construction fence onto the bowed head of Christ. The cross's roof was not added until years later. (more photos)

== Wackersdorf - Gorleben cross ==
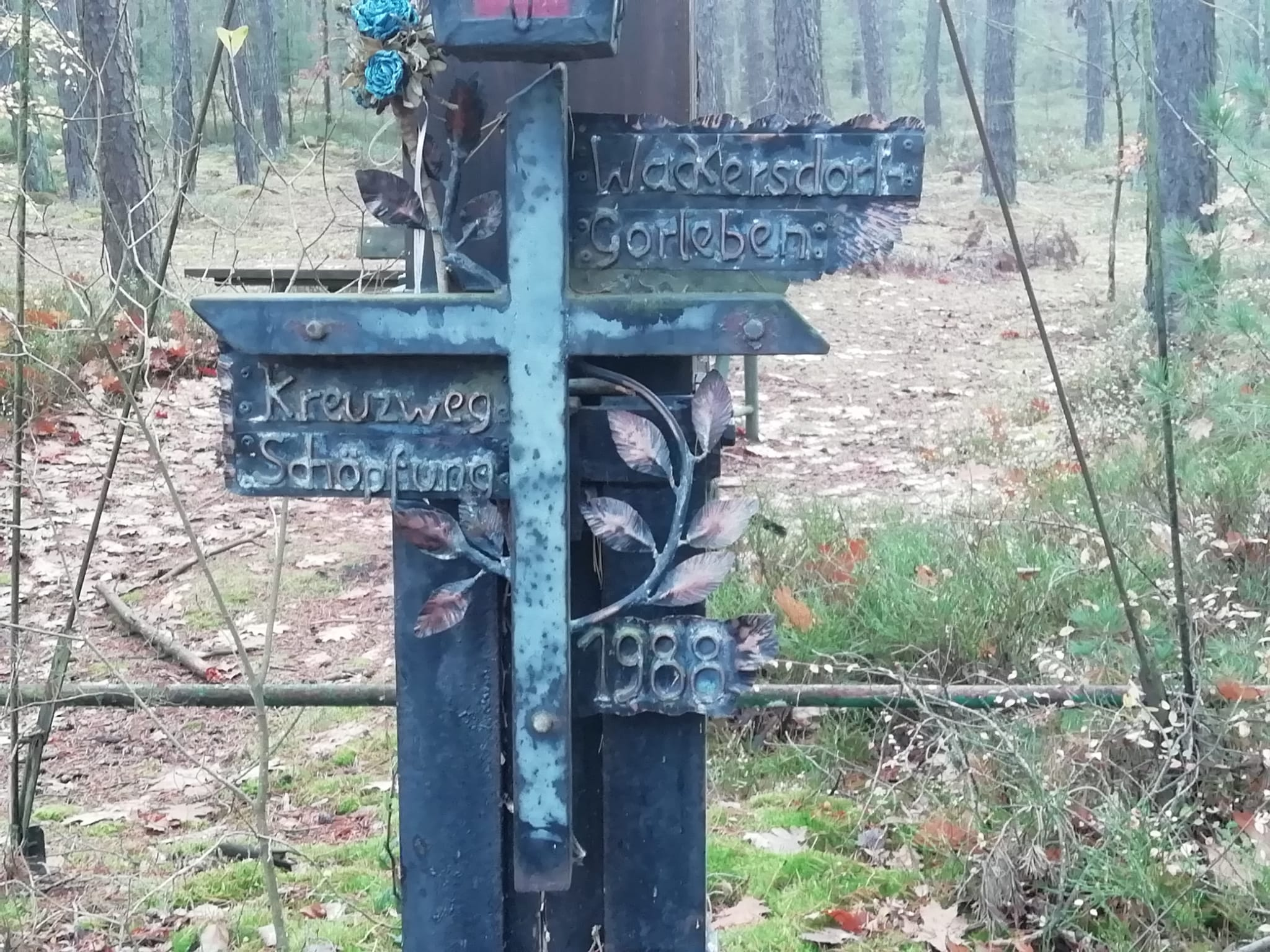
Wackersdorf - Gorleben cross

The metal memorial cross at the Franziskus-Marterl commemorates the "Stations of the Cross for Creation" undertaken by the shrine community to the Gorleben nuclear waste repository. Around 6,000 people participated from March 27 to May 29, 1988. The Franziskus-Marterl community carried a heavy wooden cross for over 1,000 km over 63 days and finally erected it in the Gorleben Forest. When the cross arrived in Gorleben, a closing service was held on May 28, 1988, with more than 1,000 people in attendance. The Gorleben Prayer was subsequently established. (more photos)
Inscription:

Wackersdorf – Gorleben / Stations of the Cross  Creation / 1988[19]

== The Torn Man ==
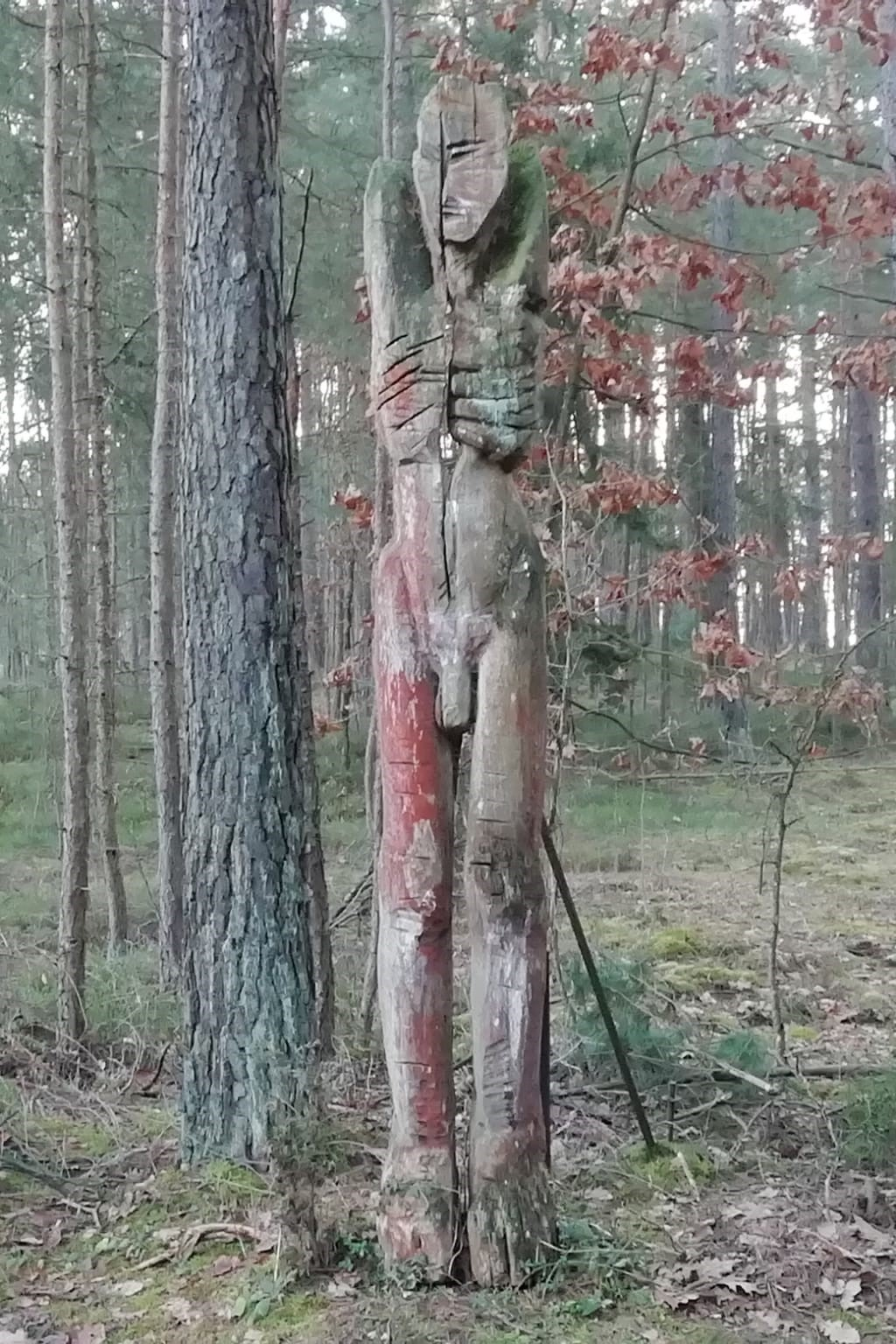
The Torn Man

"The Torn Man" (de: Der zerrissene Mensch) stands next to the Franziskus-Marterl near the WAA (nuclear reprocessing plant). The 3-meter-high wooden sculpture by the Ingolstadt sculptor Michael Graßl is intended to "express the suffering and fears of the people who have to live with and struggle against the WAA." His torso is split from head to pelvis, and his brown body is covered with blood-red stains. Graßl saw the figure as a "memorial" and a "cry of despair" and wanted to use it to protest the "destruction of the human environment and culture." The figure was erected in January 1987 with the help of the Regensburg "Working Group for Theology and Nuclear Energy" and consecrated by pastors Richard Salzl and Dörrich after an ecumenical service. (more photos)

== God's bow to protect the earth ==
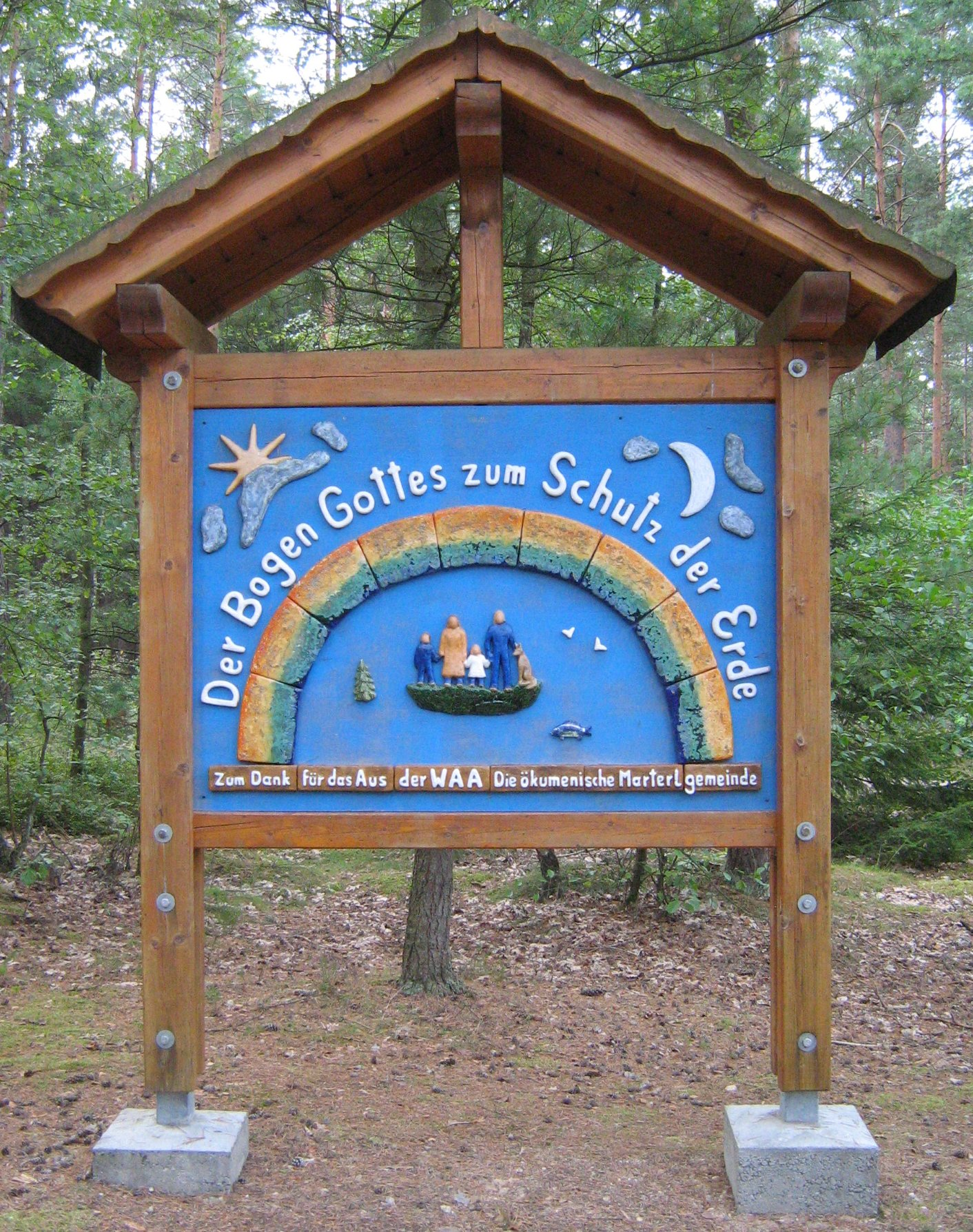
God's bow to protect the earth

God's bow to protect the earth is a memorial plaque featuring a rainbow, was erected at the Franziskus-Marterl by the local community after the cancellation of the WAA nuclear reprocessing plant project. - Clay sculpture: Valerie Schwandner (artist from Schwarzenfeld); monument construction: Wolfgang Nowak (activist); (more photos)
Inscription:

God's bow to protect the earth
In gratitude for the end of the WAA -
The ecumenical wayside shrine community[25]

== "WAA-NO" mosaic heart ==
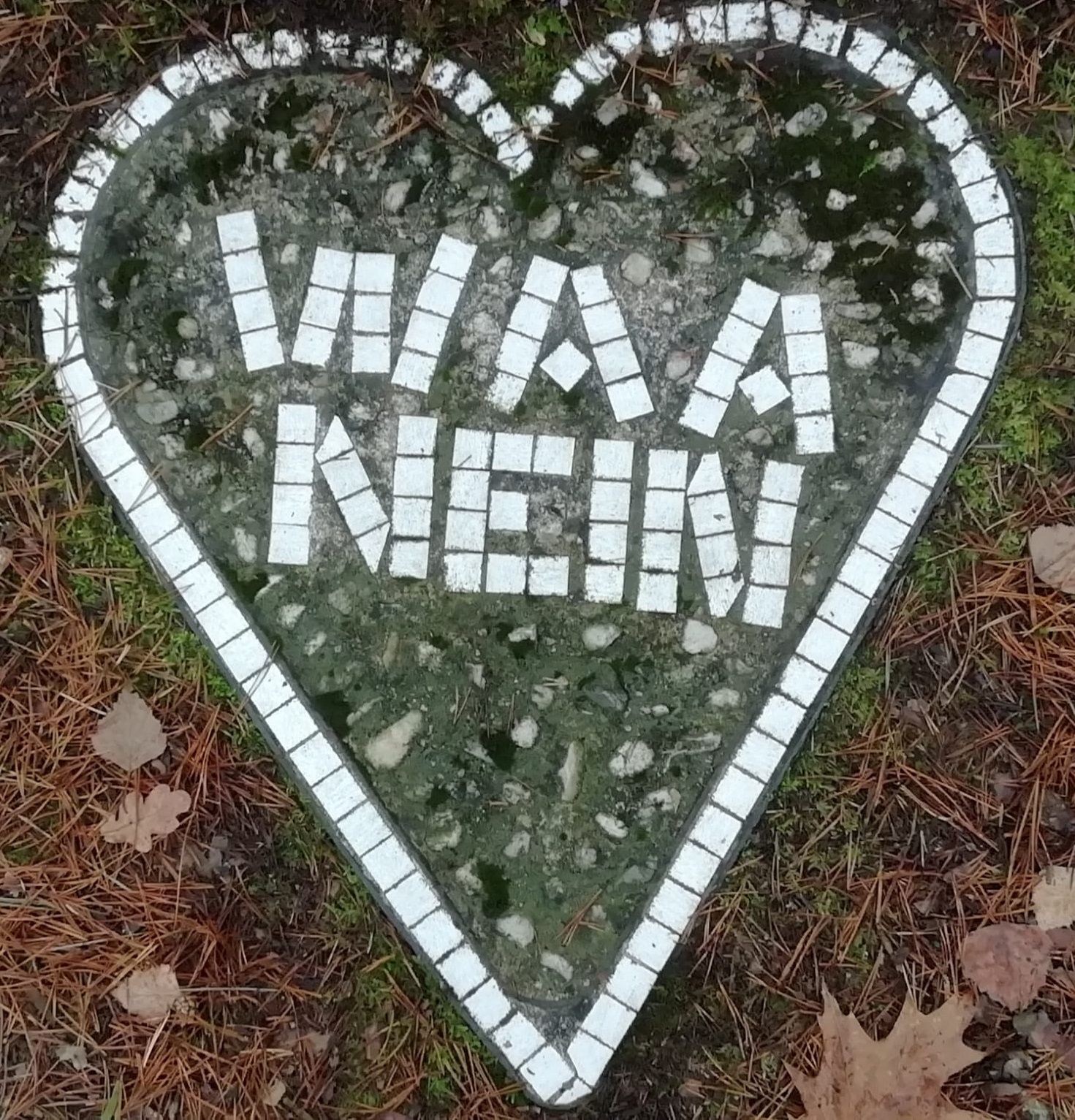
"WAA-NO" mosaic

The "WAA-NO" mosaic heart was erected by the Catholic priest Richard Salzl (stove builder and tile layer) at the foot of the Cross of Wackersdorf at the Franziskus-Marterl. (more photos)

== Austrians' Bench ==
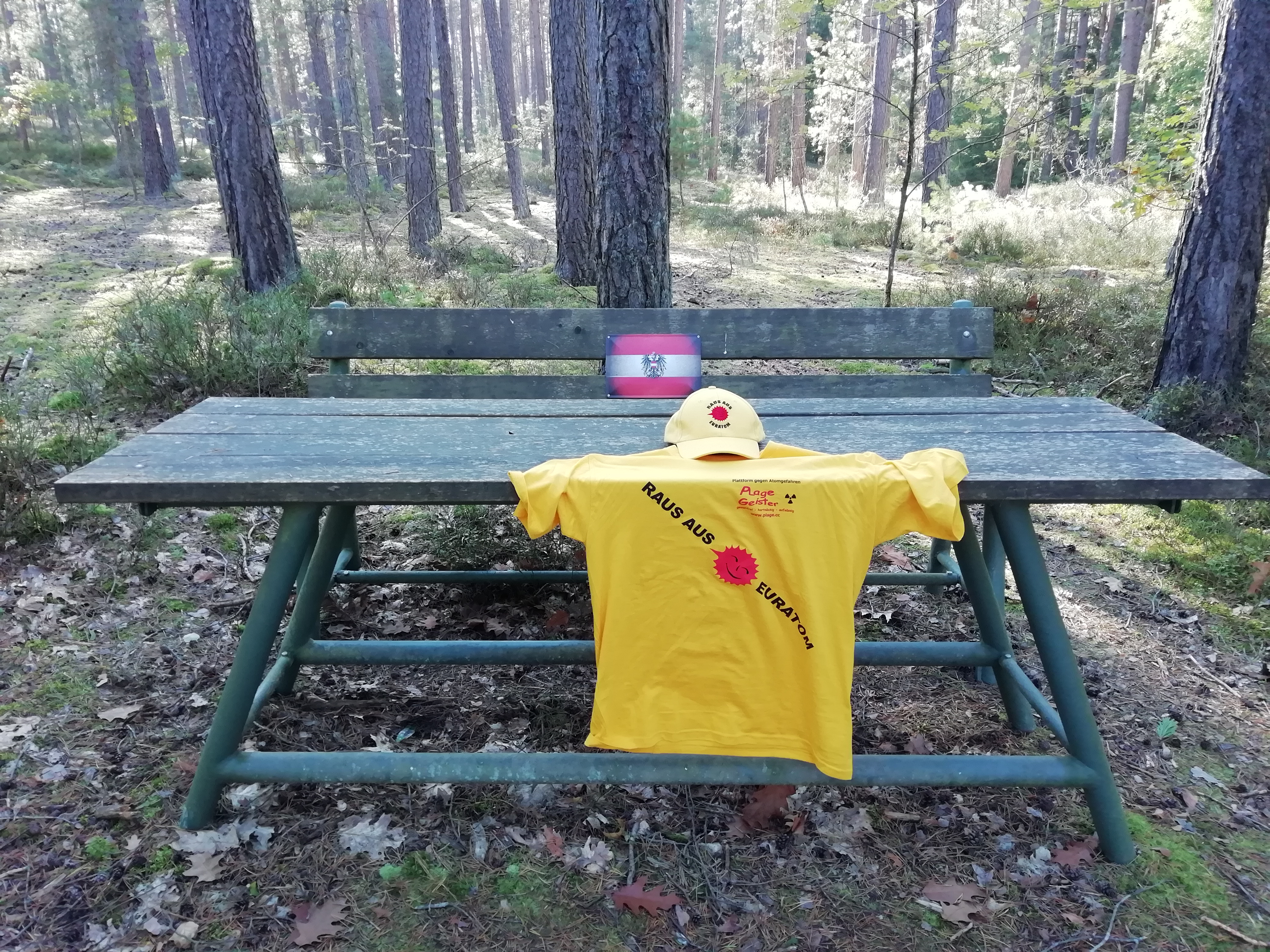
Austrians' Bench

The Austrians' Bench is a seating group at the Franziskus-Marterl. Particularly strong opposition to the WAA came from Austria (cf. WAA conflict between Bavaria and Austria). Austrian opponents of the WAA erected the seating area at the wayside shrine in the 1980s.

In 2025, a flag plaque bearing the coat of arms of the Republic of Austria was reattached to the backrest of the bench, as the original coat of arms had been lost during the renovation of the bench. Present at the subsequent wayside shrine devotion were, among others, Catholic priest Andreas Schlagenhaufer, Hans Schuierer (former District Administrator), Wolfgang Nowak (activist), and a representative of the Platform Against Nuclear Dangers Salzburg (PLAGE). (more photos)

== Wailing Wall of the Franziskus-Marterl ==
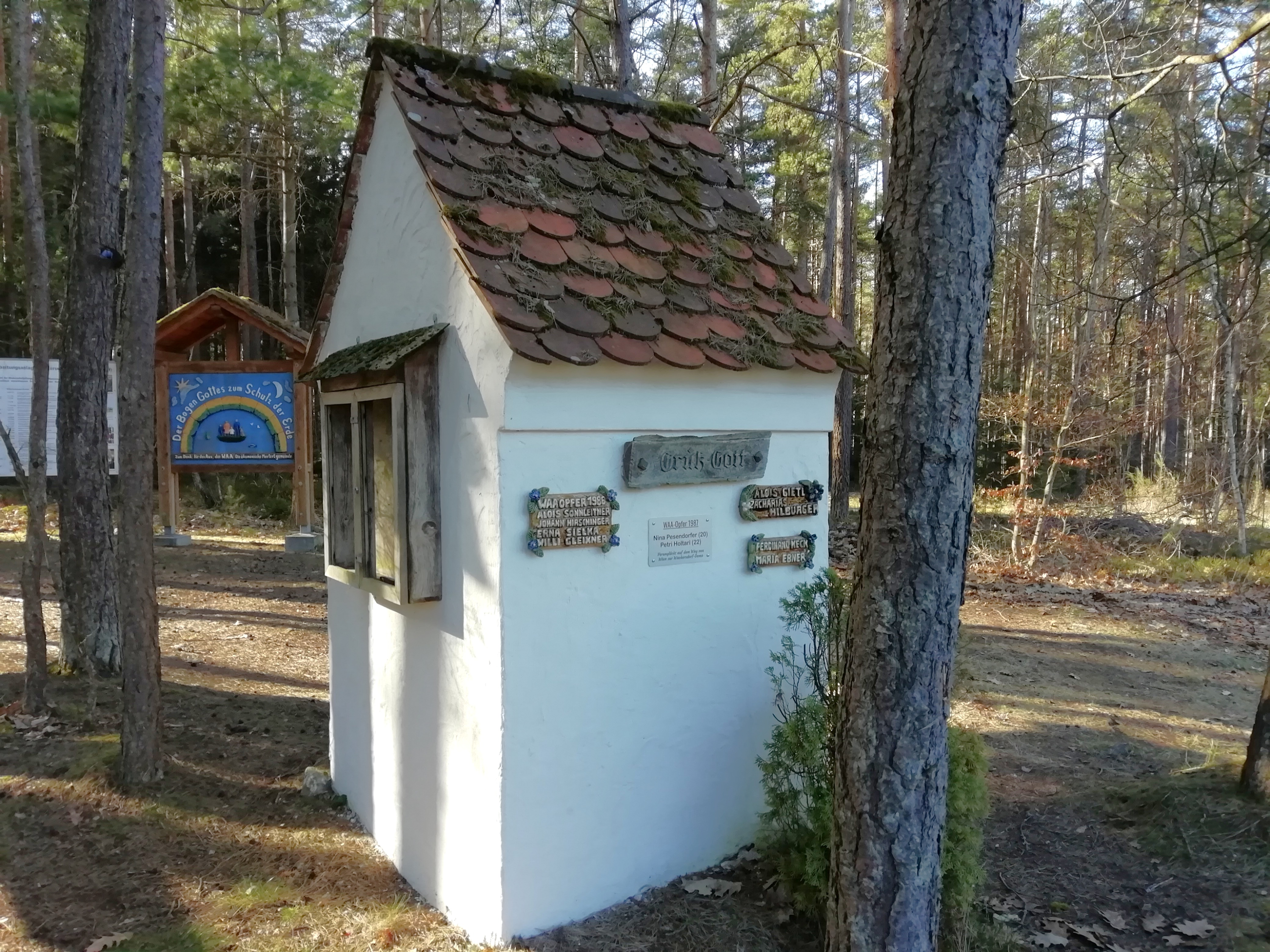
Wailing Wall (Franziskus-Marterl)

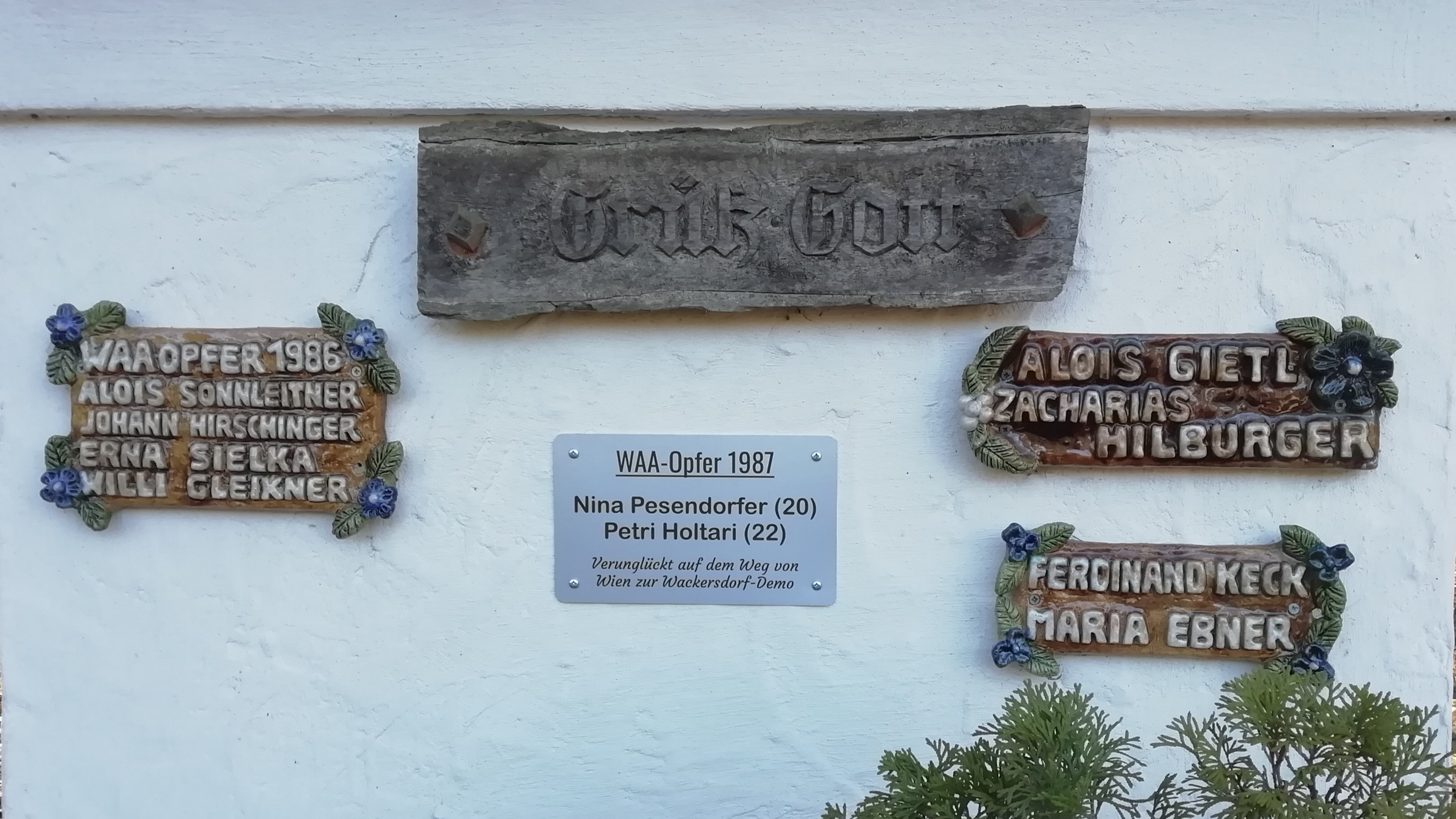
Wall of mourning for the dead

The wall of mourning for the dead at the Franziskus-Marterl commemorates through memorial plaques victims of the WAA and deceased activists who opposed the Wackersdorf Reprocessing Plant (WAA); the clay plaques were created by the artist Valerie Schwandner from Schwarzenfeld.

In 2026, a memorial plaque was dedicated to the Austrian opponents of the WAA - Nina Pesendorfer and Petri Holtari who were killed in a fatal accident in 1987 while traveling from Vienna via South Tyrol) to the "White Demonstration" organized among others by the International Physicians for the Prevention of Nuclear War (IPPNW). The accident occurred on the A93 motorway between Siegenburg and Abensberg, near Sallingberg. (more photos)
Inscriptions:

God bless you

WAA Victims 1986
Alois Sonnleitner[34]  /  Johann Hirschinger[35]
Erna Sielka[36]  /  Willi Gleikner[37]

WAA Victims 1987
Nina Pesendorfer (20)  /  Petri Holtari (22)
Killed in an accident while traveling from Vienna to the Wackersdorf Demonstration

Alois Gietl[38]   /  Zacharias Hilburger

Ferdinand Keck  /  Maria Ebner

== Trees at the Franziskus-Marterl ==
At the Franciscan shrine, several protest trees against the WAA (nuclear reprocessing plant) were planted.

=== Oak of Resistance ===
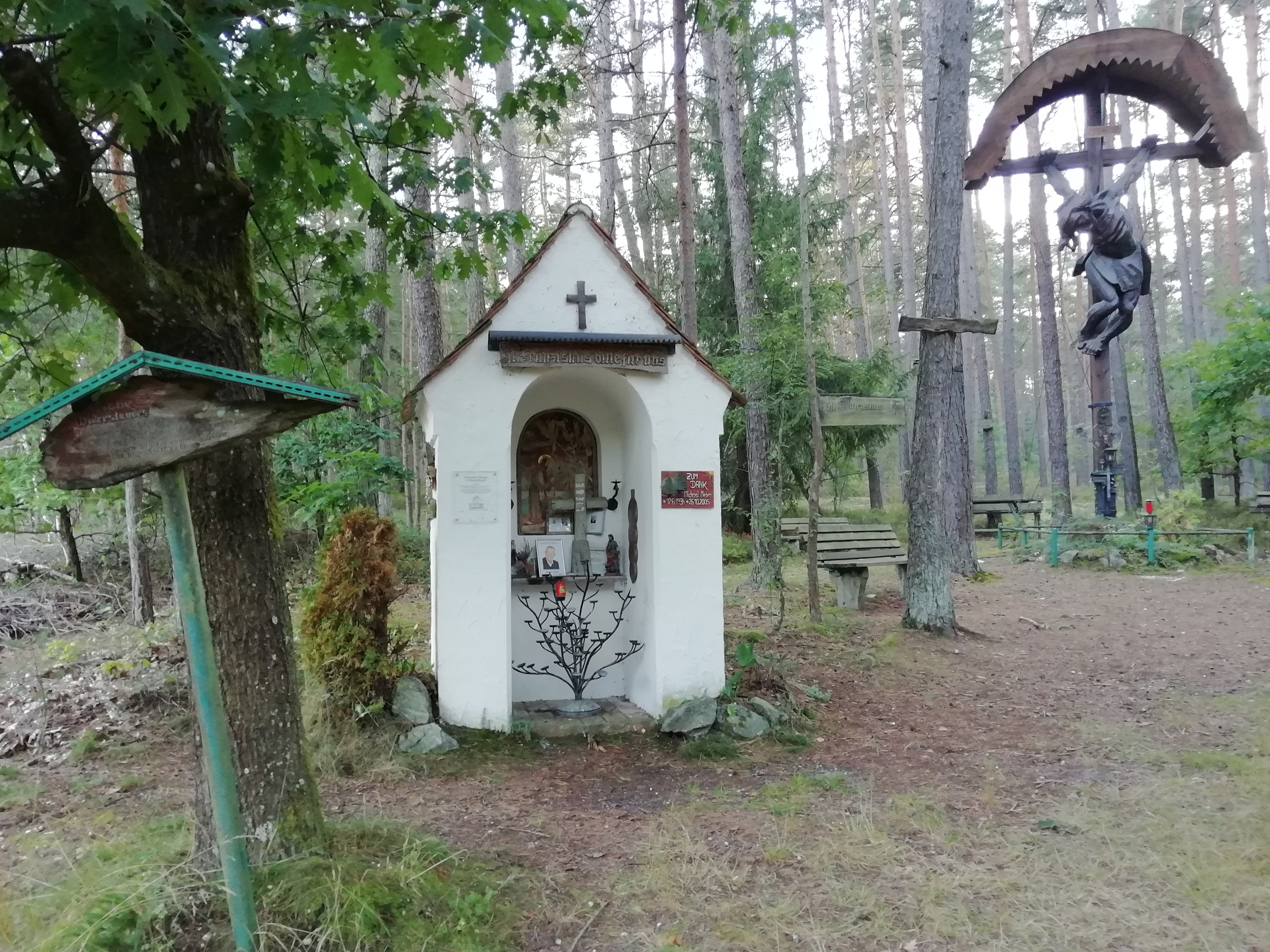
Oak of Resistance (on the left)

The Oak of Resistance was planted in 1985 by the Amberg Citizens' Initiative. The wooden plaque stands in front of the oak, to the left of the Franziskus-Marterl. (more photos)
Inscription on the wooden plaque:

Oak of Resistance
A tree in whose branches birds will sing, in whose rough bark beetles will live, the wind will drive its leaves, the sunlight will cast shadows on green moss for your well-being.
It shall be a symbol of our will not to leave our homeland unprotected.
Amberg Citizens' Initiative, April 27, 1985[40]

=== Bund-Naturschutz Tilia ===
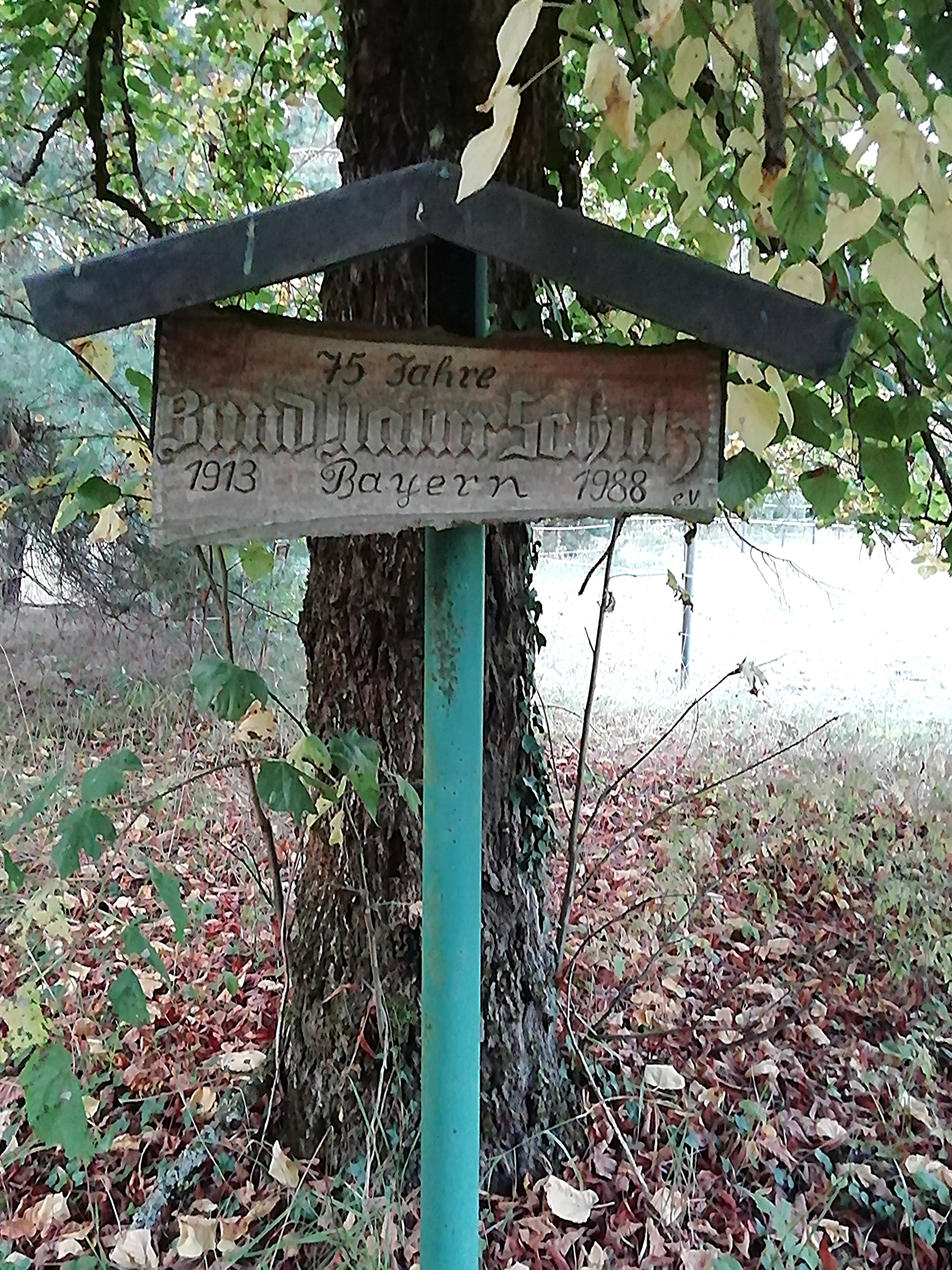
Bund-Naturschutz Tilia

The tilia tree at the Franziskus-Marterl was planted in 1988 to mark the 75th anniversary of the Bund Naturschutz in Bayern (Bavarian Nature Conservation Association). (more photos)
Inscription on the wooden plaque:

75 Years
Bund NaturSchutz e.V.
 
1913  Bavaria  1988

=== Martin Luther Apple Tree ===
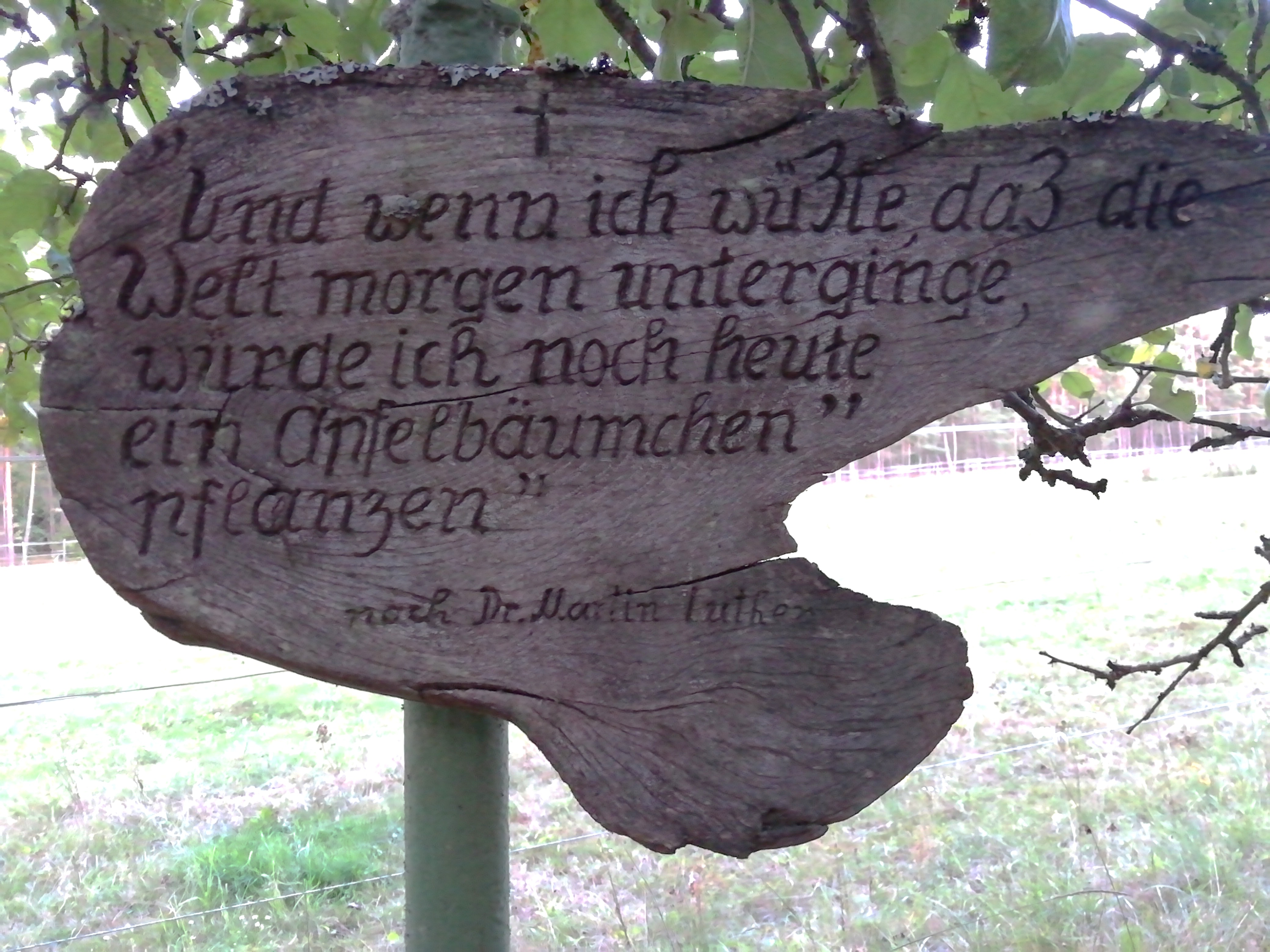
Martin Luther Apple Tree

The Martin Luther Apple Tree (cf. Luther's apple tree) at the Franziskus-Marterl near the Wackersdorf reprocessing plant (WAA) was donated and planted by conservationist Leonhard Fuchs from Sulzbürg (Neumarkt district). (more photos)
Inscription on the wooden plaque:

Even if I knew that the
world would end tomorrow,
I would still plant
an apple tree today.
    after Dr. Martin Luther[43]

== Red Cross in Wackersdorf ==
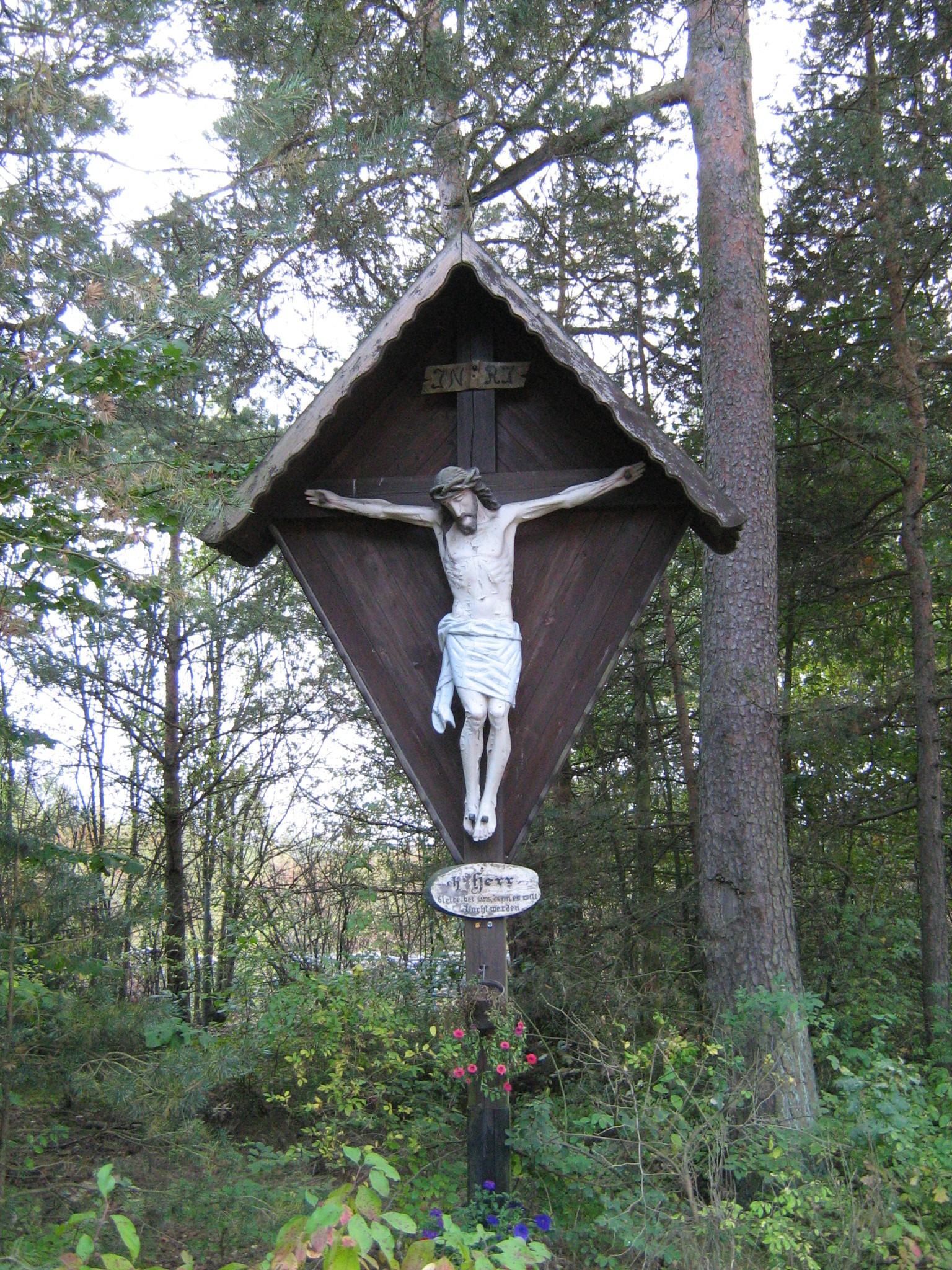
Red Cross

The Red Cross, located west of the WAA (nuclear reprocessing plant) and not far from the "Chaos Corner," was a popular meeting place for many WAA opponents. Ecumenical services were also held there. (more photos)
Inscription:

O Lord
stay with us for night
is drawing near.[46]

== White Cross in Teublitz ==
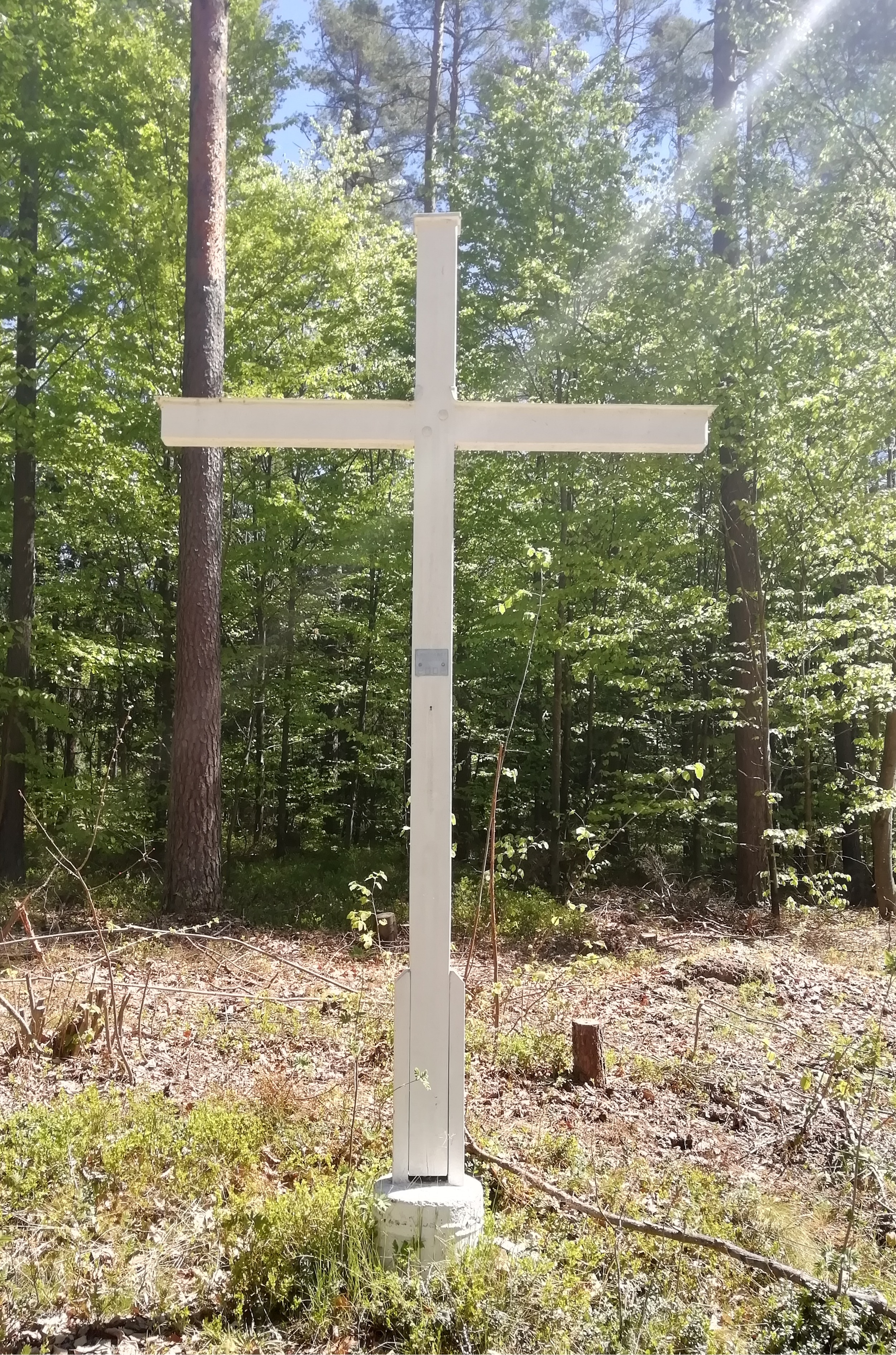
White Cross in Teublitz

The "White Cross" was erected in the Samsbach Forest (Teublitz) in 1986 as a protest against the Wackersdorf reprocessing plant (WAA).

A birch cross was erected in 1986 by Teublitz opponents of the reprocessing plant. In 1992, Josef Strießl and Josef Faltermeier replaced the rotten birch cross with a three-meter-high brown cross with a concrete foundation. After three weeks, the cross was painted white by unknown people. In 2002 the Teublitz running club renovated the cross. (more photos)
Inscriptions:

1992 
(in the concrete base)

Running club 
Teublitz 
2002

== Anti-WAA votive offerings ==
There are still some votive offerings in Bavaria today. (more photos)

=== Votive offering in Altötting ===
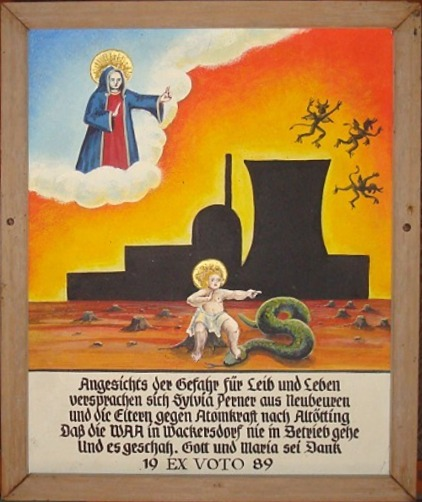
Ex-voto (Altötting)

In the Chapel of Grace in Altötting there is also a ex-voto in gratitude for the closure of the Wackersdorf Reprocessing Plant (WAA) in 1989.
Inscription:

Faced with the danger to life and limb,
Sylvia Perner from Neubeuren
and her parents made a vow to Altötting against nuclear power.
That the WAA in Wackersdorf would never go into operation.
And it happened. Thanks be to God and Mary.
19 EX VOTO 89[50]

=== Votive offering in Amberg ===
The votive offering was exhibited in the Amberg City Museum in 2009.

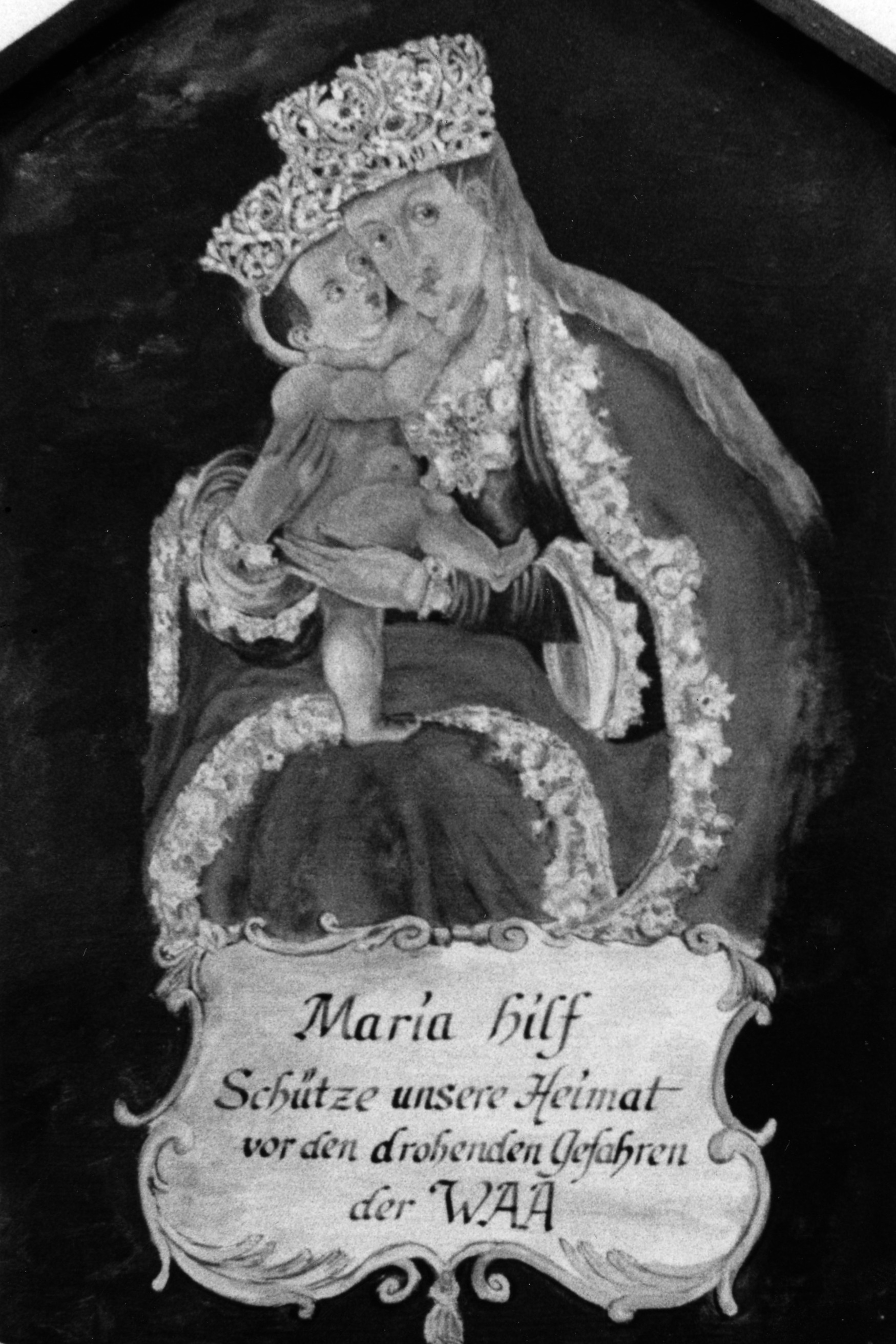

The ex-voto against the Wackersdorf reprocessing plant (WAA) was painted by Berndt Trepesch and carried to the Mariahilfberg pilgrimage church in Amberg.
The votive tablet was presented to Father Theodor Berberich of the Franciscan Maria-Hilf Monastery in 1986 by the KLJ, KJG, BDKJ and citizens' initiatives after a multi-day fasting and protest action on the Mariahilfberg against the WAA.
Inscription:

Mary, help
Protect our homeland 
from the impending dangers 
of the WAA[54]

=== Votive offering in Schwandorf ===
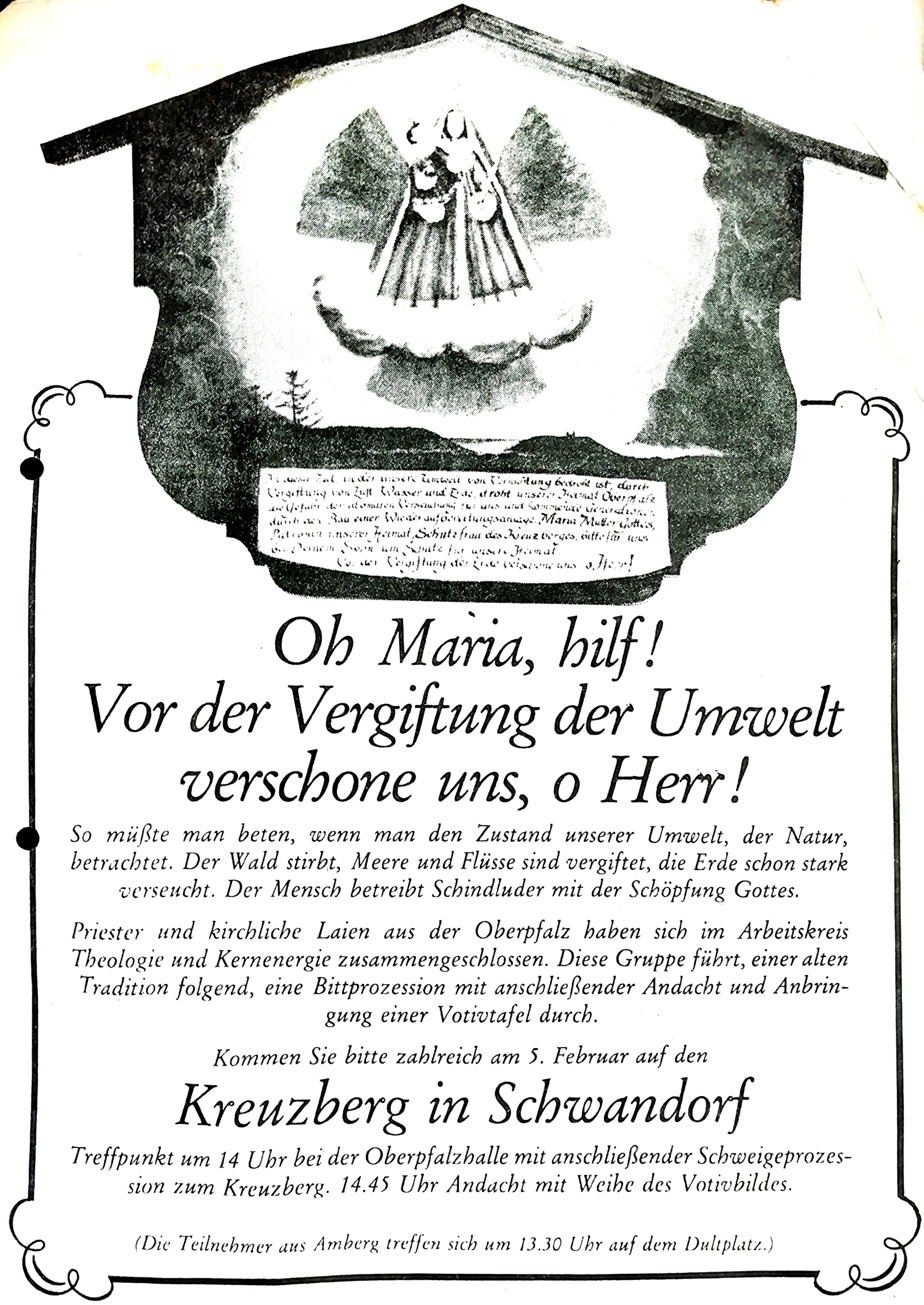
Invitation to the Rogation Procession 1984

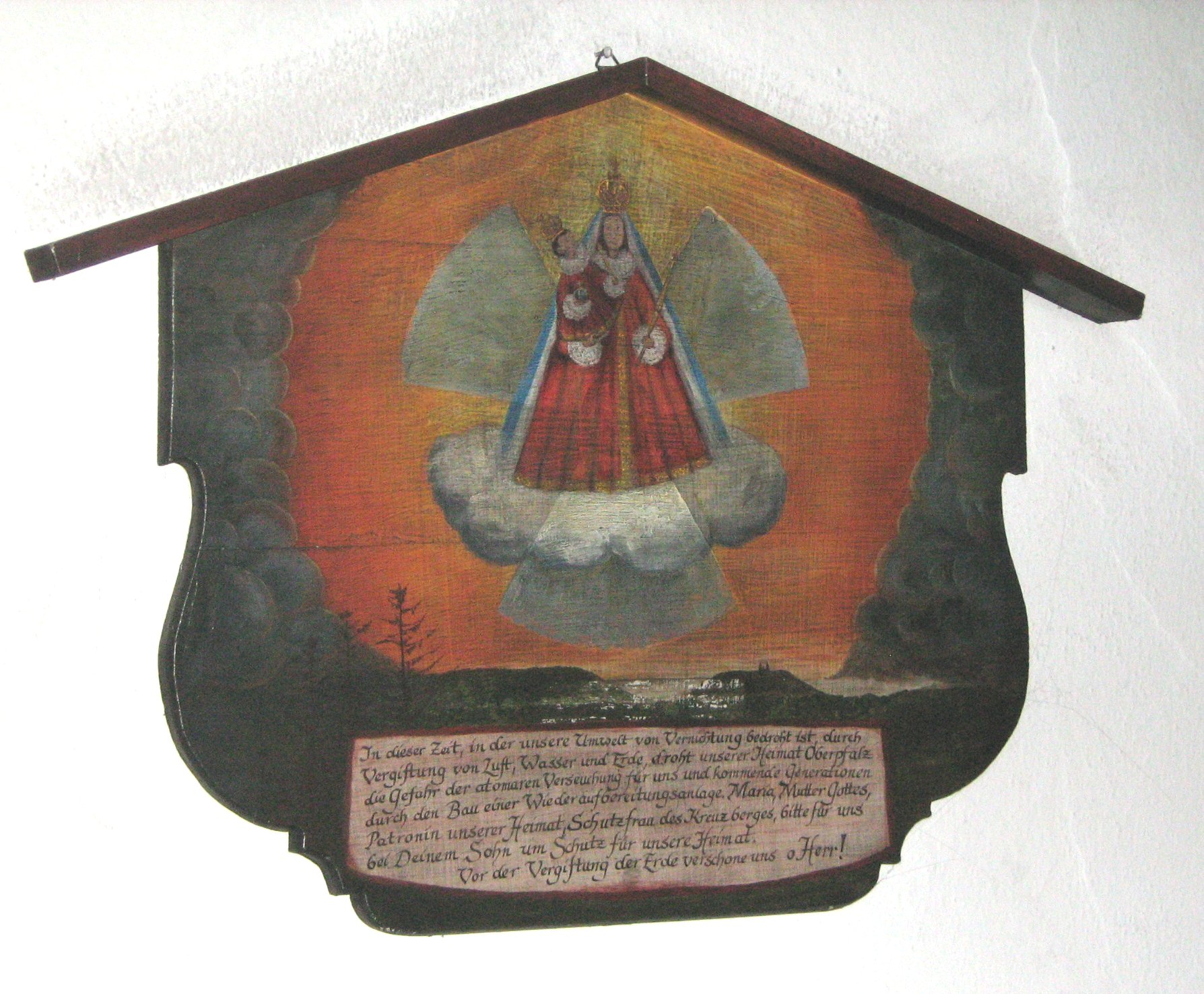
Votive offering in the Kreuzberg Church (Schwandorf)

The votive offering by the artist Berndt Trepesch was carried from the Church of Our Lady of Kreuzberg in Schwandorf during a Rogation procession organized by the Regensburg Working Group on Theology and Nuclear Energy in 1984.
Inscription:

In this time, when our environment is threatened with destruction through the poisoning of air, water, and soil, our homeland, the Upper Palatinate, is threatened by the danger of nuclear contamination for us and future generations through the construction of a reprocessing plant. Mary, Mother of God, patroness of our homeland, protector of Kreuzberg, pray for us to your Son for the protection of our homeland.
Preserve us from the poisoning of the earth, O Lord![58]

== Wayside shrine from Main-Spessart in Altenschwand ==
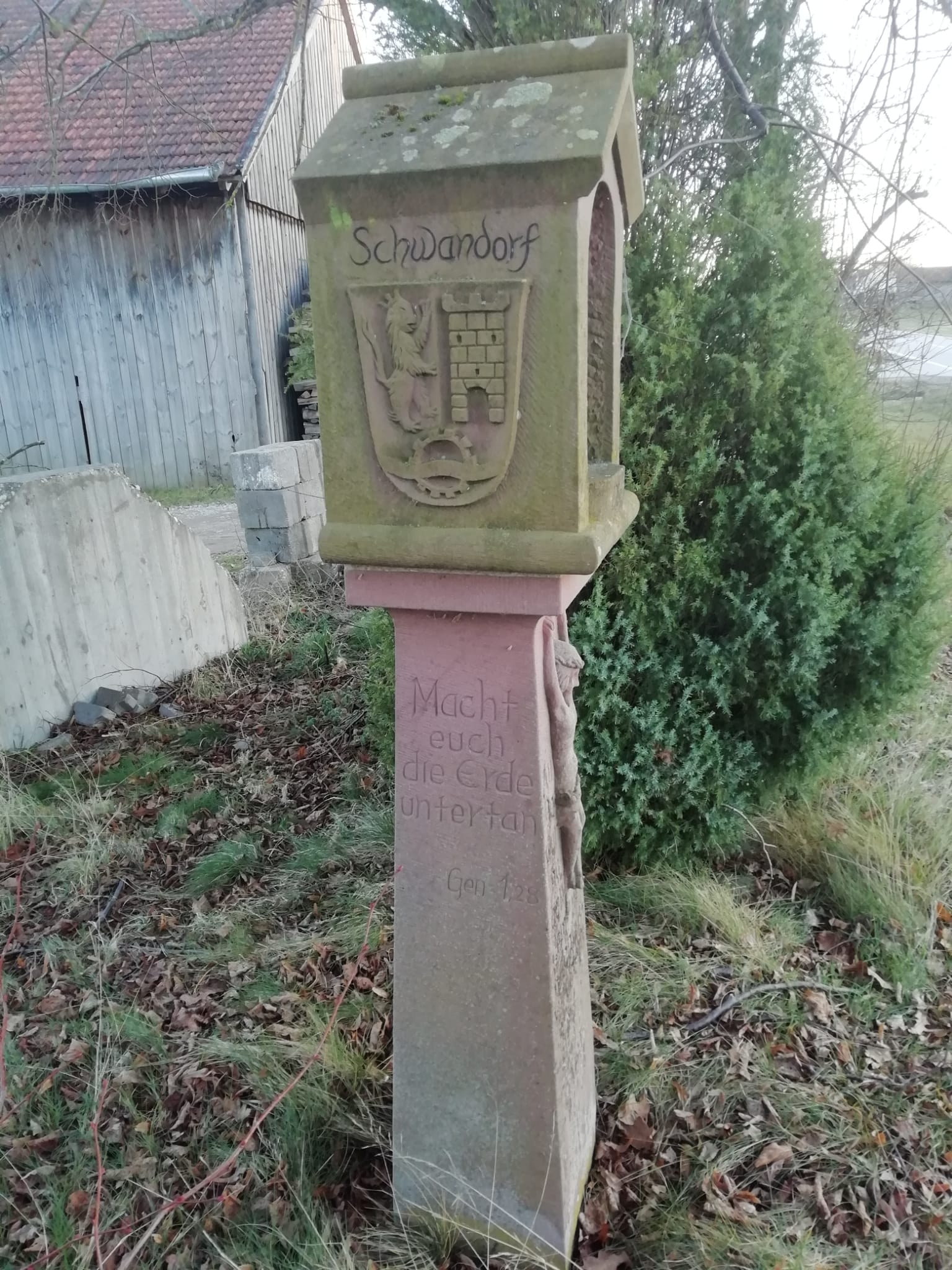
Wayside shrine with the coat of arms of Schwandorf (district)

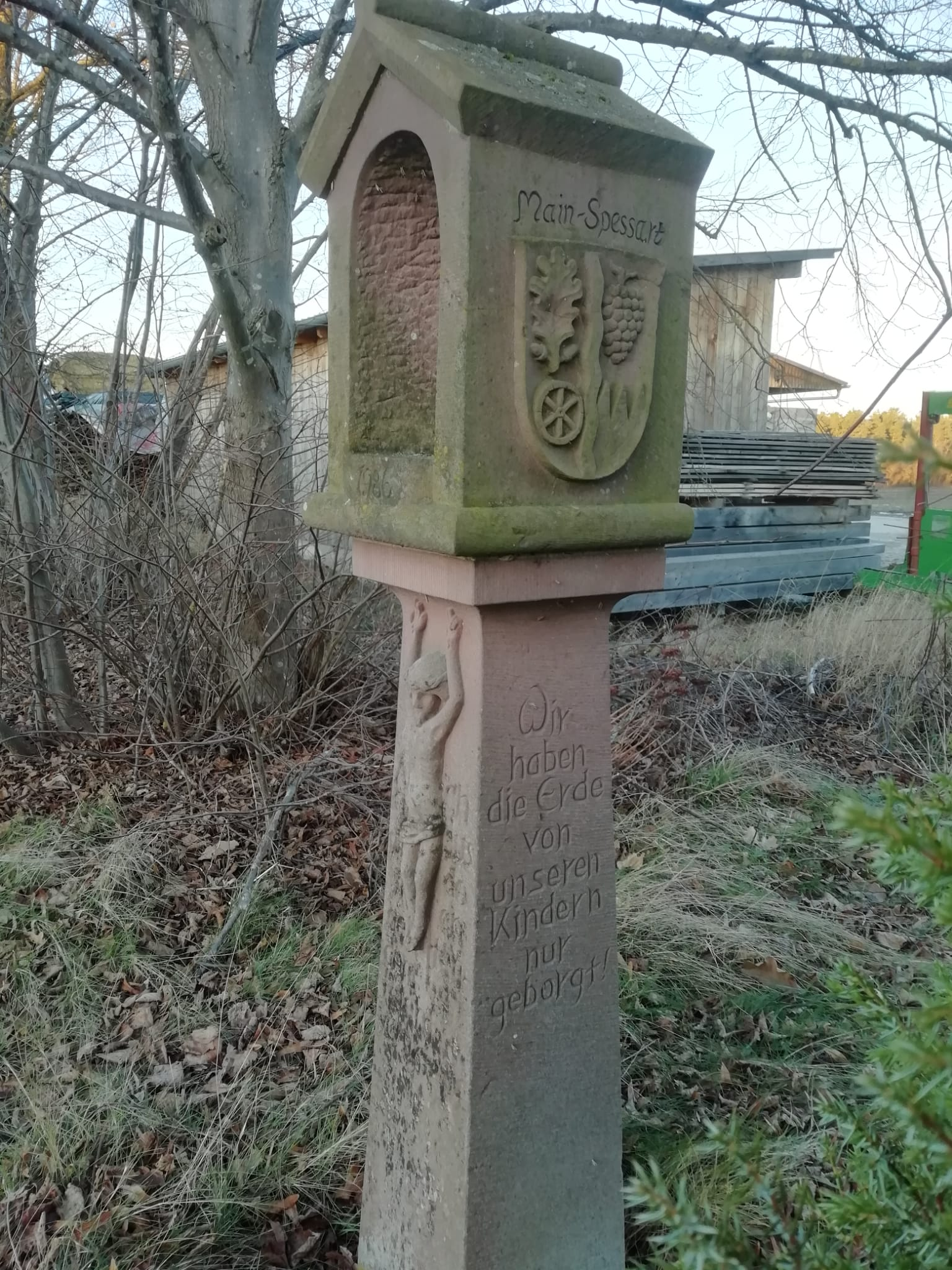
Wayside shrine with the coat of arms of Main-Spessart (district)

As a form of peaceful protest, a stone wayside shrine by Horst Wittstadt from the Main-Spessart district was erected in 1987 near the WAA reprocessing plant in Altenschwand. (more photos)
Inscriptions:

Front: 1986 / Even Jesus was condemned under current law
Left side: Schwandorf + Coat of arms / Subdue the earth - (Genesis 1:28)
Right side: Main-Spessart + Coat of arms / We have only borrowed the earth from our children!
Back: by Horst Wittstadt, Karlstadt a. M. / The WAA affects and threatens us all! As a reminder and warning

== Memorial Stone in Altenschwand ==
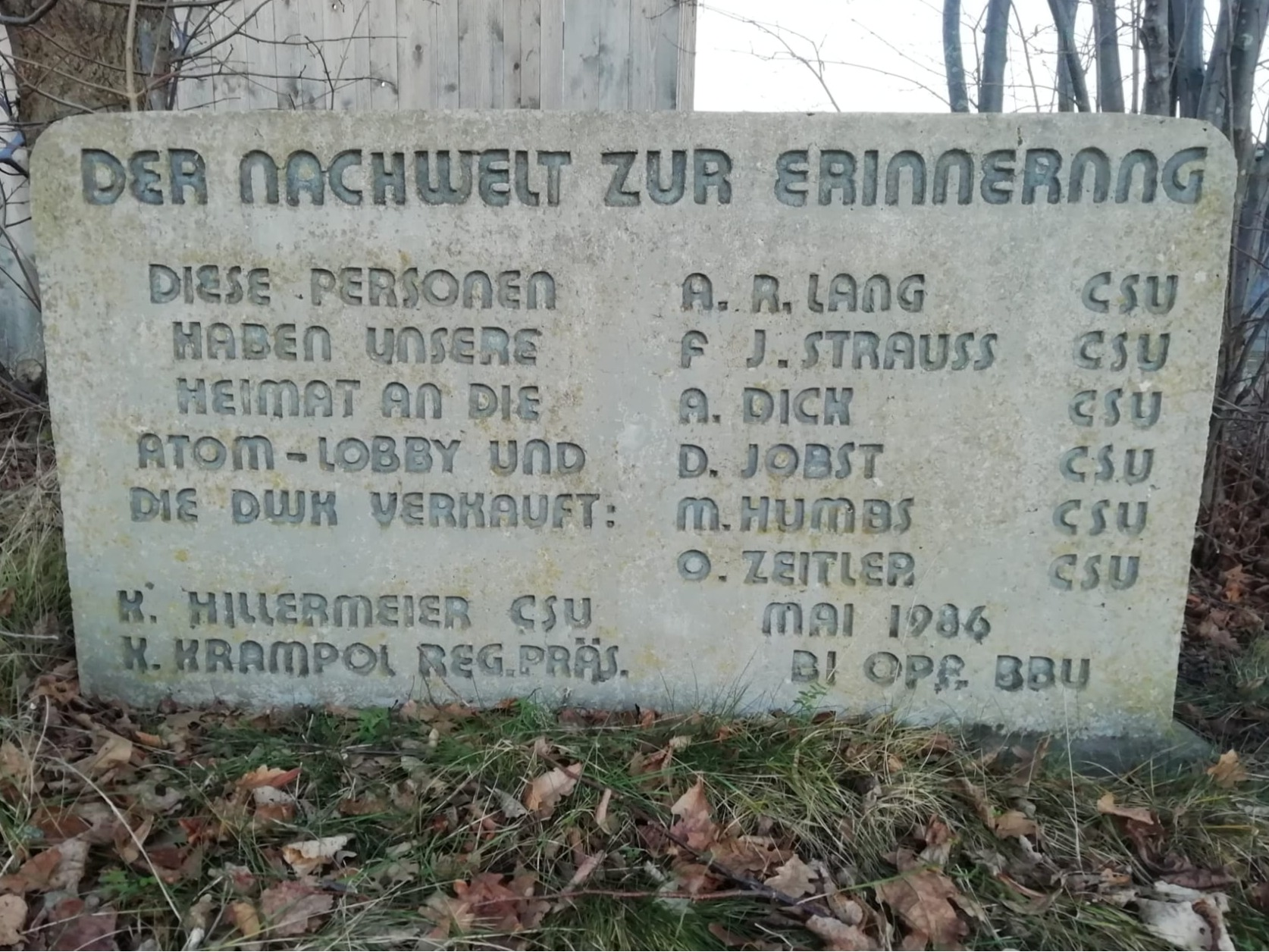
Anti-WAA Memorial Stone in Altenschwand

The memorial stone was erected in May 1986 by citizens' initiatives from the Upper Palatinate region in a meadow near the WAA site at Altenschwand (Bodenwöhr). It is a "special example of the connection between the erection of a monument as a performative act of protest and its function as a memorial." Leopold Keller from Lenzkirch created the concrete memorial. He had already established 29 such memorials against nuclear power in West Germany, Austria, and Switzerland. The mayor of Bodenwöhr, Josef Wiendl, had unsuccessfully attempted to prevent the erection of the "WAA Atonement Stone" in Altenschwand. Among those present at the unveiling were Hans Schuierer, Helmut Wilhelm (BBV), and Klaus Pöhler. (more photos)
Inscription:

In memory of posterity
These people sold out our homeland to the nuclear lobby and DWK[68]:
K. Hillermeier[69] CSU / K. Krampol[70] / A. R. Lang[71] CSU / F. J. Strauß CSU / A. Dick CSU / D. Jobst[72] CSU / M. Humbs[73] CSU / O. Zeitler[74] CSU
May 1986 / BI OPf. BBU

== Memorial Stone in Brennberg ==
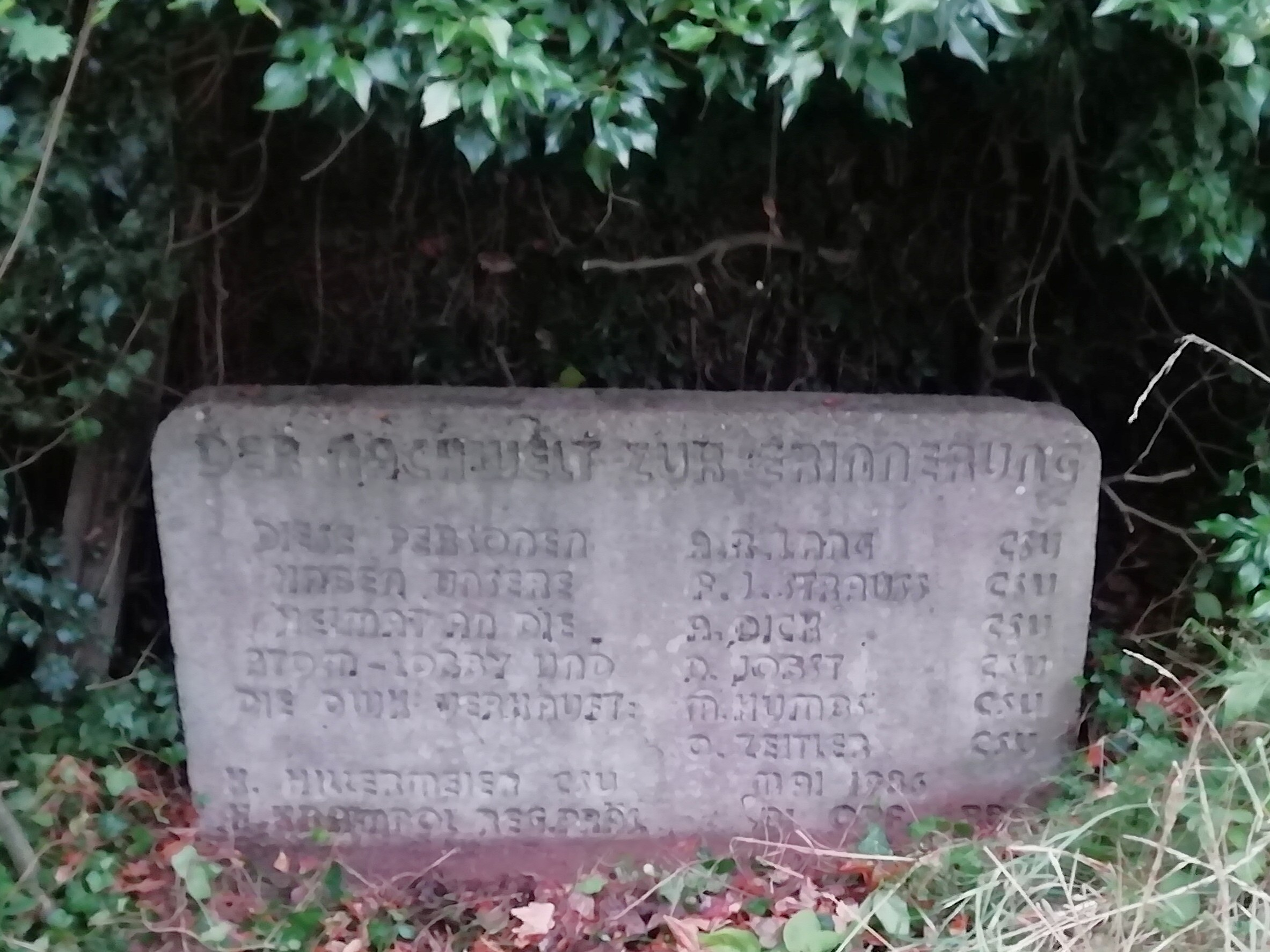
Anti-WAA Memorial Stone in Brennberg

This memorial stone was erected in May 1986 by Leopold Keller, Eberhard Klein and citizens' initiatives from the Upper Palatinate region in Fahnmühle-Brennberg. (more photos)
Inscription:

In memory of posterity
These people sold out our homeland to the nuclear lobby and DWK:
K. Hillermeier CSU / K. Krampol
A. R. Lang CSU / F. J. Strauß CSU / A. Dick CSU / D. Jobst CSU / M. Humbs CSU / O. Zeitler CSU
May 1986 / BI OPf. BBU

== Barn doors in Kölbldorf ==
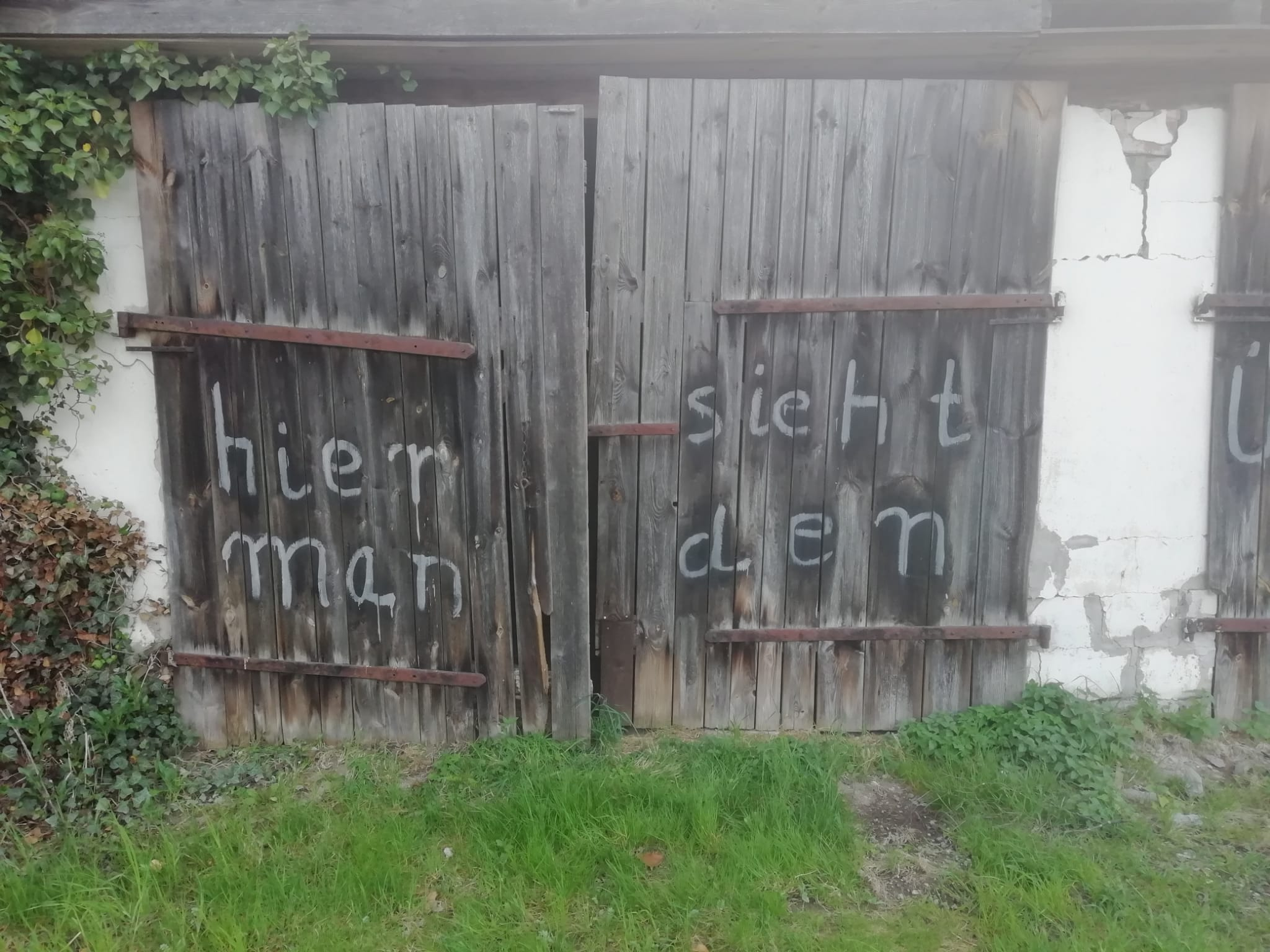
Barn doors in Kölbldorf (2025)

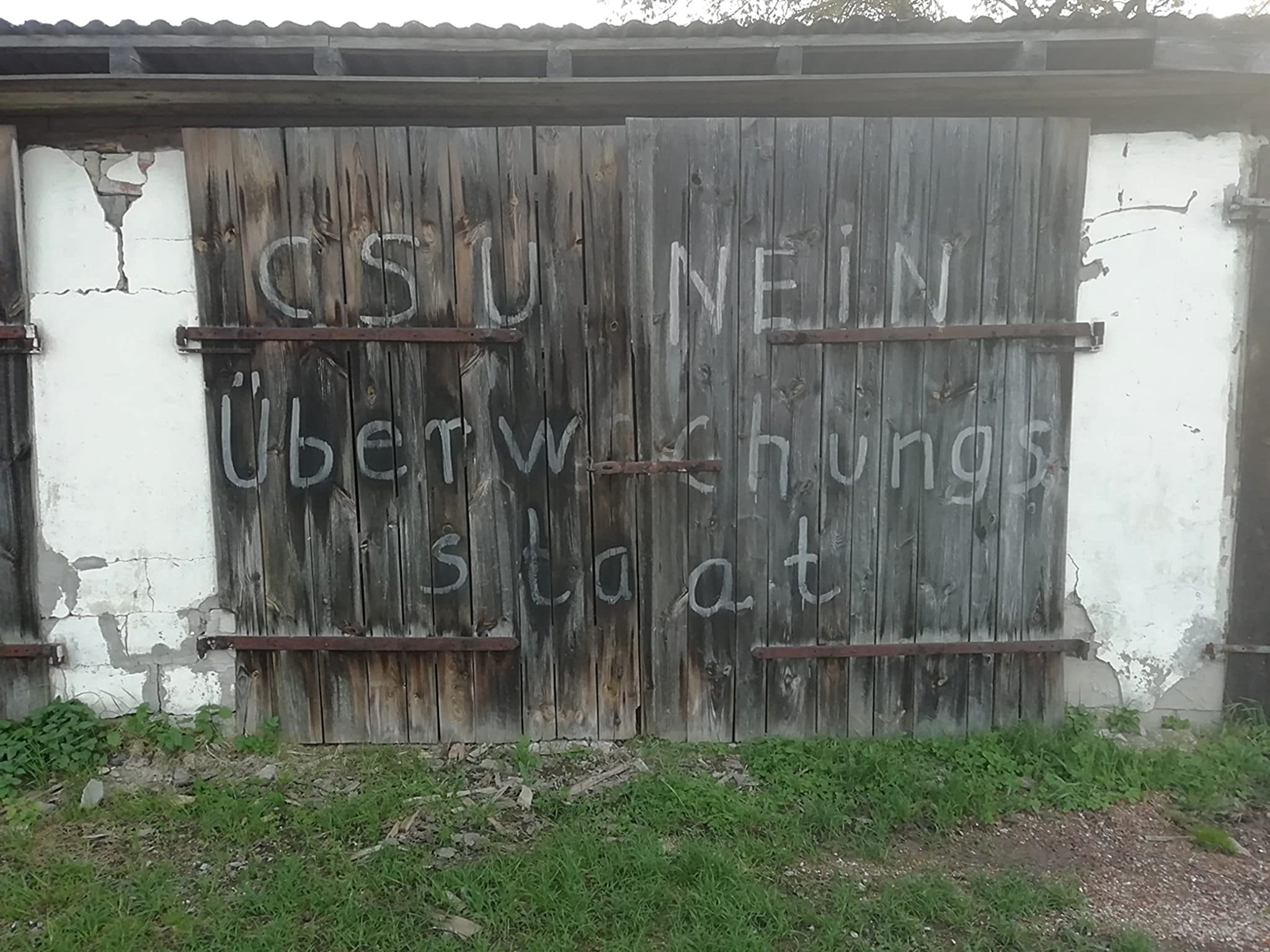
Barn doors in Kölbldorf (2025)

Farmer Josef Fischer from Kölbldorf (Bruck) protested against the WAA by displaying slogans on his barn doors. In 1986, Kölbldorf was surrounded and searched by 500 police officers to arrest WAA protesters who had spent the night there. Josef Fischer's farm was also searched after he sheltered protesters and provoked the authorities with his slogan on the barn door. The police action was also questioned in the Bundestag. (more photos)

Inscriptions:

CSU NO
here you can see the surveillance state[81]

== Anti-WAAhnsinns-Festival Memorial ==
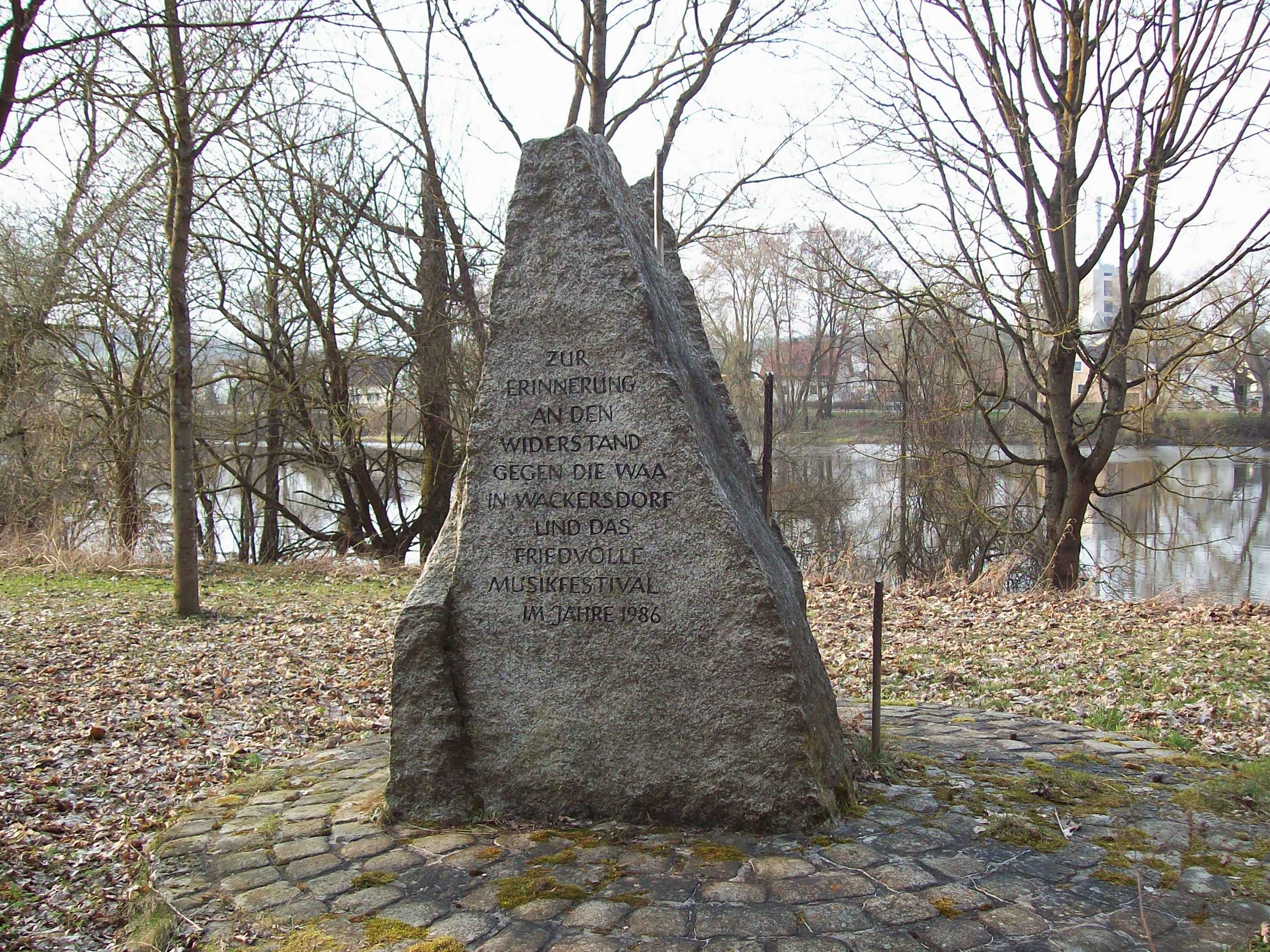
Anti-WAAhnsinns Festival Memorial

The memorial stone at Lanzenanger in Burglengenfeld (Bavaria) commemorates the 5th Anti-WAAhnsinns Festival 1986, held in support of the protests against the Wackersdorf reprocessing plant (WAA). The fifth WAAhnsinns Festival was one of the largest rock concerts in West German history. More than 100,000 people protested peacefully against the planned WAA. It is often referred to as a "cultural event of the century" and the "German Woodstock."

Helmut Schuster, a teacher from Burglengenfeld, applied for the memorial, and the city of Burglengenfeld covered the costs. Stonemason Arnold Bachl designed the memorial, intending it to express the division between supporters and opponents that existed among the population during the WAA era. Bachl split a massive granite stone; between the pieces, stainless steel rods symbolize the construction fence that had been erected around the WAA construction site. (more photos)
Inscription:

In memory of the resistance against the WAA in Wackersdorf and the peaceful music festival in 1986[86]

== Resistance Oak with commemorative plaque ==
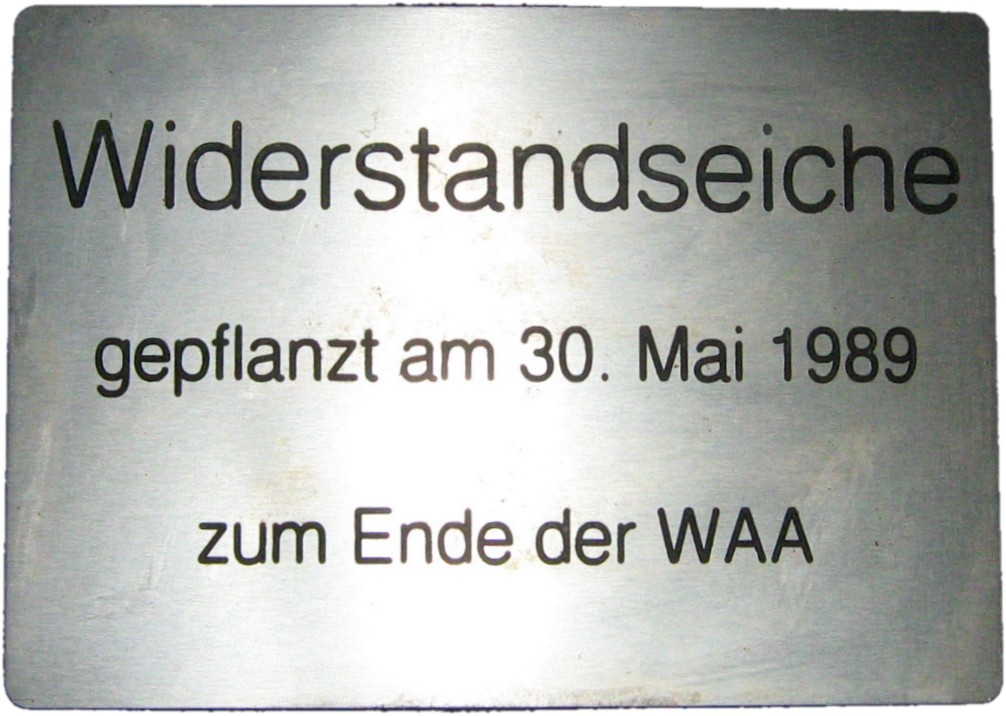
Anti-WAA plaque in Pfreimd (49.492518°N 12.185366°E)

Resistance oak with commemorative plaque in Pfreimd: When the construction halt of the WAA (nuclear reprocessing plant) was announced on May 30, 1989, a "resistance oak" was planted in front of the Protestant St. Paul's Church as a symbol of a "radioactive" future. In 2009, a commemorative plaque was unveiled there and the oak was blessed. (more photos)
Inscription:

Resistance Oak
planted on May 30, 1989,
to mark the end of the WAA[90]

== Memorials in the House of Bavarian History ==
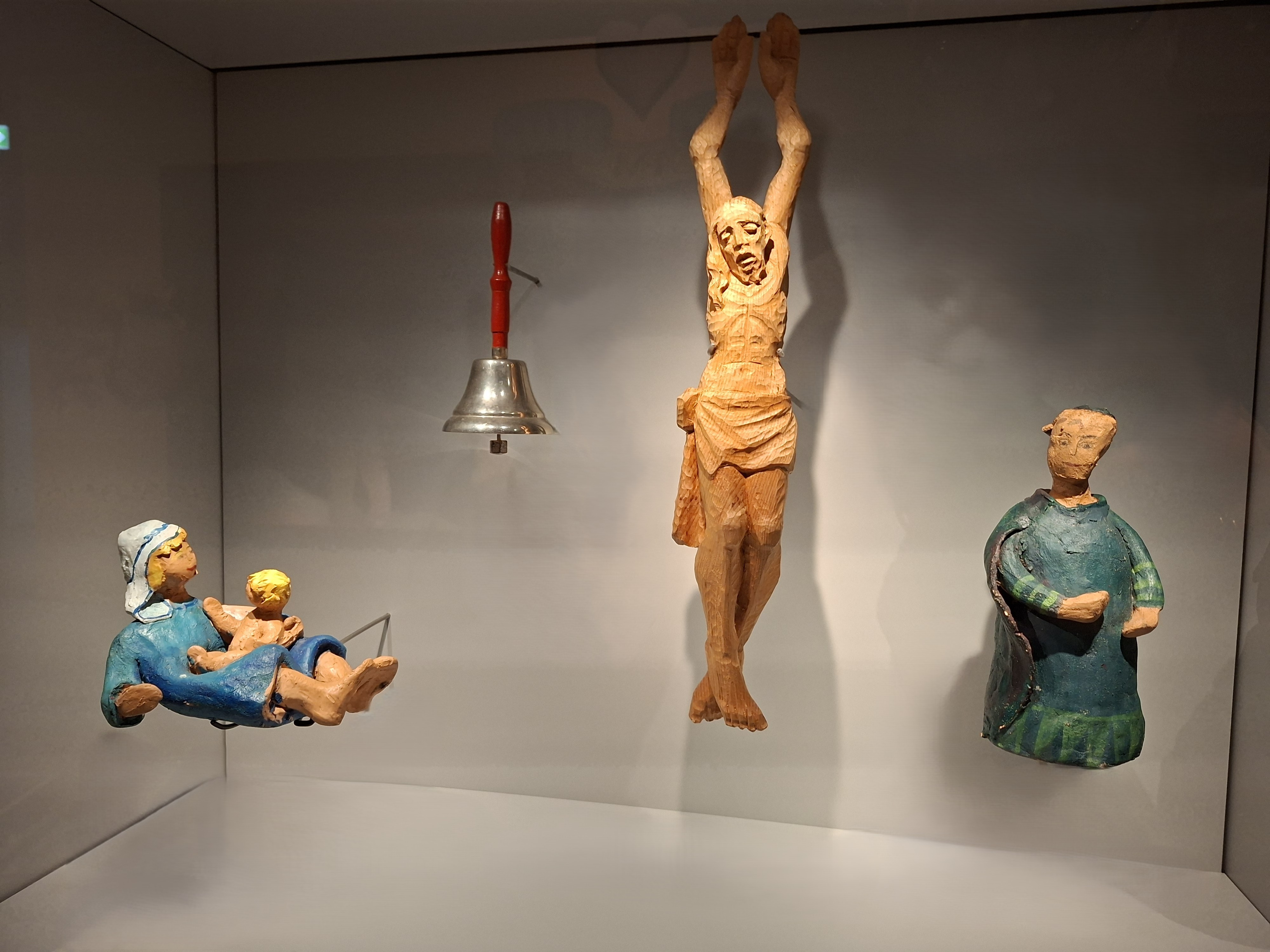
Mary, Jesus and Joseph from the Wackerland Nativity scene with Wackerland Cross corpus model

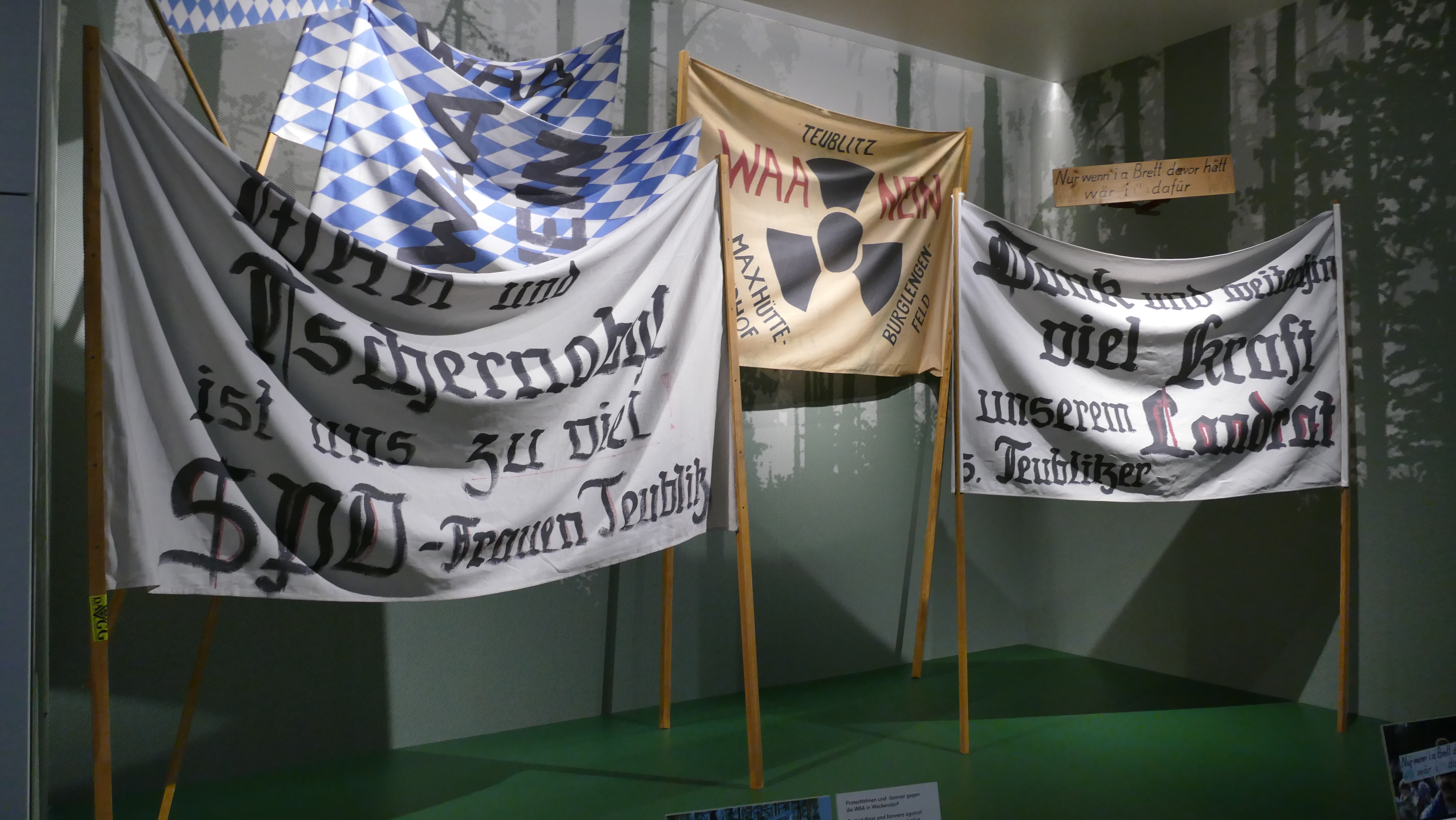
Banners on the WAA Stage at the House of Bavarian History

The House of Bavarian History (HdBG) in Regensburg addresses the protests against the Wackersdorf reprocessing plant in Wackersdorf in its permanent exhibition (Generation 8, WAA). Self-made flags and banners from the anti-WAA protest in Wackersdorf have been given their own stage in the museum. (more photos)
Banner inscriptions:

* WAA and Chernobyl are too much for us - SPD Women Teublitz
* WAA NO
* WAA NO  Teublitz  Burglengenfeld  Maxhütte-Haidhof
* Thanks and continued strength to our District Administrator (Schuierer) S. Teublitzer
* Only if I were completely obtuse would I be in favor of WAA[96][97]

== Information panels of the Schwandorf district ==
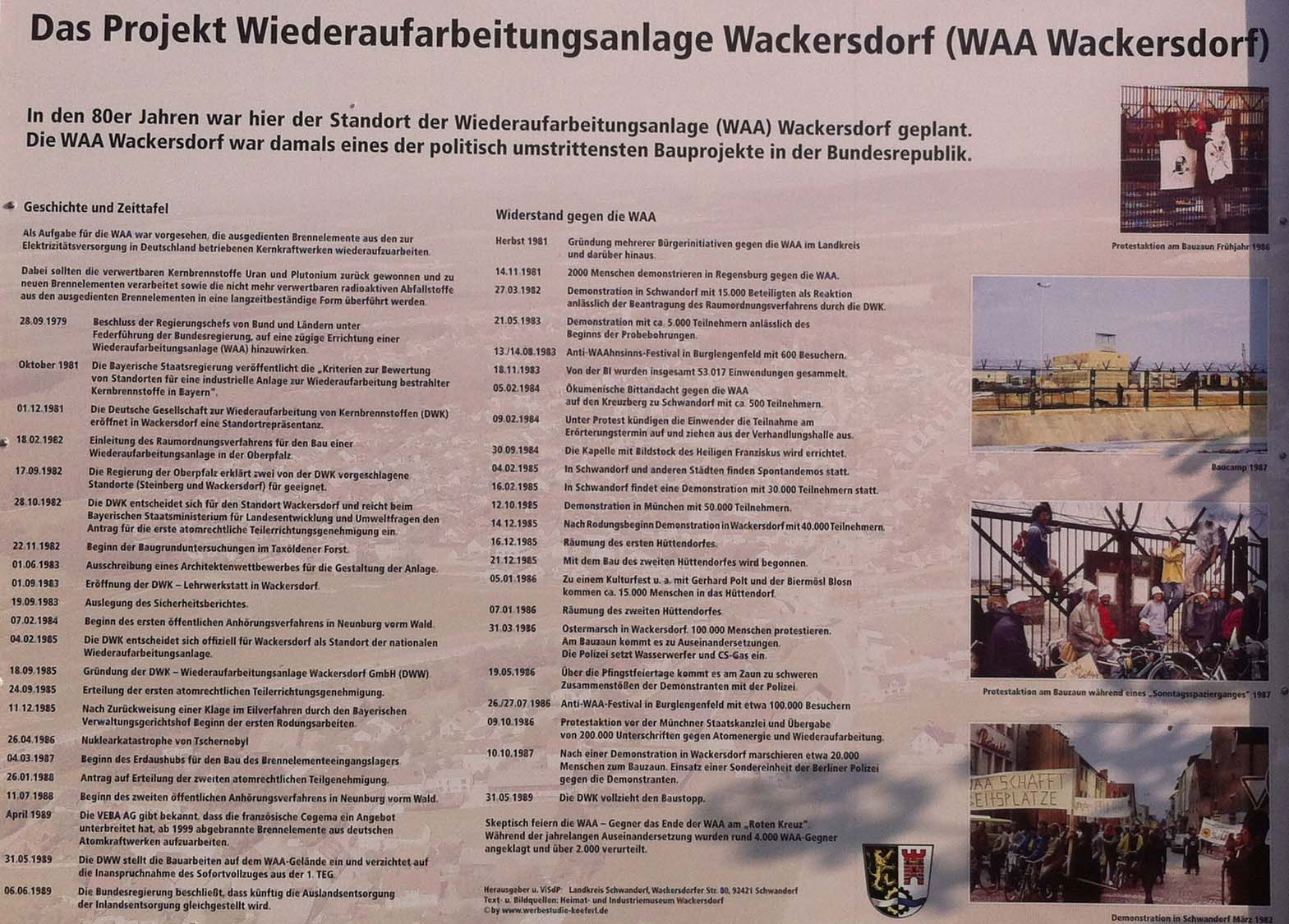
Memorial plaque

Today, two official commemorative plaques of the Schwandorf district commemorate the construction of and the resistance against the Wackersdorf reprocessing plant. In 2016, a commemorative plaque was unveiled at the Franziskus-Marterl, documenting the construction progress and the development of the resistance against the planned reprocessing plant up to the abandonment of the project. A similar information panel is also located on the former WAA site in front of the BMW plant. (more photos)

Inscription:

The Wackersdorf reprocessing plant Project (WAA Wackersdorf)

In the 1980s, this was the planned location for the Wackersdorf Reprocessing Plant (WAA). At the time, the WAA Wackersdorf was one of the most politically controversial construction projects in West Germany.

History and Timeline

The WAA's task was to reprocess spent fuel elements from the nuclear power plants used to supply electricity in Germany.

This involved recovering the usable nuclear fuels uranium and plutonium and processing them into new fuel elements, as well as converting the non-usable radioactive waste from the spent fuel elements into a long-term stable form.

September 28, 1979

Decision by the heads of government of the federal and state governments, under the leadership of the Federal Government of Germany, to work towards the rapid construction of a reprocessing plant.

October 1981

The Bavarian State Government publishes the "Criteria for Evaluating Sites for an Industrial Plant for the Reprocessing of Spent Radioactive Fuel in Bavaria."

December 1, 1981

The German Society for the Reprocessing of Nuclear Fuels (DWK) opens a site office in Wackersdorf.

February 18, 1982

Initiation of the regional planning procedure for the construction of a reprocessing plant in the Upper Palatinate.

September 17, 1982

The Upper Palatinate government declares two sites proposed by the DWK (Steinberg and Wackersdorf) suitable.

October 28, 1982

DWK selects Wackersdorf as the site and submits the application for the first partial construction permit under nuclear law to the Bavarian State Ministry for Regional Development and Environmental Affairs.

November 22, 1982

Soil investigations begin in the Taxöldern Forest.

June 1, 1983

An architectural competition for the plant's design is announced.

September 1, 1983

The DWK training workshop opens in Wackersdorf.

September 19, 1983

The safety report is made available for public review.

February 7, 1984

The first public hearing begins in Neunburg vorm Wald.

February 4, 1985

DWK officially selects Wackersdorf as the site for the national reprocessing plant.

September 18, 1985

Establishment of DWK-Wackersdorf Reprocessing Plant GmbH (DWW).

September 24, 1985

Granting of the first partial construction permit under nuclear law.

December 11, 1985

After the Bavarian Administrative Court dismissed an expedited legal action, the first clearing work began.

April 26, 1986

Chernobyl nuclear disaster

March 4, 1987

Excavation begins for the construction of the spent fuel storage facility.

January 26, 1988

Application submitted for the second partial nuclear permit.

July 11, 1988

The second public hearing begins in Neunburg vorm Wald.

April 1989

VEBA AG announces that the French company Cogema has submitted a bid to reprocess spent fuel elements from German nuclear power plants starting in 1999.

May 31, 1989

DWW halts construction work on the WAA site and waives its right to immediate enforcement under the first partial permit (TEG). ... June 6, 1989

The Federal Government of Germany decides that in future, waste disposal abroad will be treated equally to domestic waste disposal.

Resistance against the WAA

Autumn 1981

Foundation of several citizens' initiatives against the WAA in the district and beyond.

November 14, 1981

2,000 people demonstrate against the WAA in Regensburg.

March 27, 1982

Demonstration in Schwandorf with 15,000 participants in response to DWK's application for the regional planning procedure.

May 21, 1983

Demonstration with approximately 5,000 participants to mark the start of exploratory drilling.

August 13/14, 1983

Anti-WAAhnsinns-Festival Festival in Burglengenfeld with 600 attendees.

November 18, 1983

The citizens' initiative collected a total of 53,017 objections.

February 5, 1984

Ecumenical prayer service against the WAA on Kreuzberg hill (Kreuzberg Church, Schwandorf) in Schwandorf with approximately 500 participants.

February 9, 1984

Under protest, the objectors withdraw from the hearing and leave the courtroom.

September 30, 1984

The chapel with the wayside shrine (Franziskus-Marterl) of Saint Francis is erected.

February 4, 1985

Spontaneous demonstrations take place in Schwandorf and other cities.

February 16, 1985

A demonstration with 30,000 participants takes place in Schwandorf.

October 12, 1985

Demonstration in Munich with 50,000 participants.

December 14, 1985

After the start of clearing work, a demonstration with 40,000 participants takes place in Wackersdorf.

December 16, 1985

Eviction of the first hut village.

December 21, 1985

Construction of the second hut village (Free Republic of Wackerland) begins.

January 5, 1986

Approximately 15,000 people attend a cultural festival in the hut village, featuring Gerhard Polt and the Biermösl Blosn, among others.

January 7, 1986

Eviction of the second hut village (Free Republic of Wackerland)

March 31, 1986

Easter march in Wackersdorf. 100,000 people protest. Clashes break out at the construction fence. Police use water cannons and CS gas.

May 19, 1986

Over the Pentecost holidays, there are serious clashes between demonstrators and police at the fence.

July 26/27, 1986

Fifth Anti-WAAhnsinns-Festival in Burglengenfeld with approximately 100,000 attendees.

October 9, 1986

Protest in front of the Bavarian State Chancellery in Munich and handover of 200,000 signatures against nuclear energy and reprocessing.

October 10, 1987

Following a demonstration in Wackersdorf, approximately 20,000 people march to the construction fence. A special unit of the Berlin police is deployed against the demonstrators.

May 31, 1989

DWK halts construction.

Opponents of the WAA (nuclear reprocessing plant) celebrate the project's end at the "Red Cross" site with skepticism.

During the years-long conflict, around 4,000 WAA opponents were charged and over 2,000 convicted.

== WAA Construction Fence ==
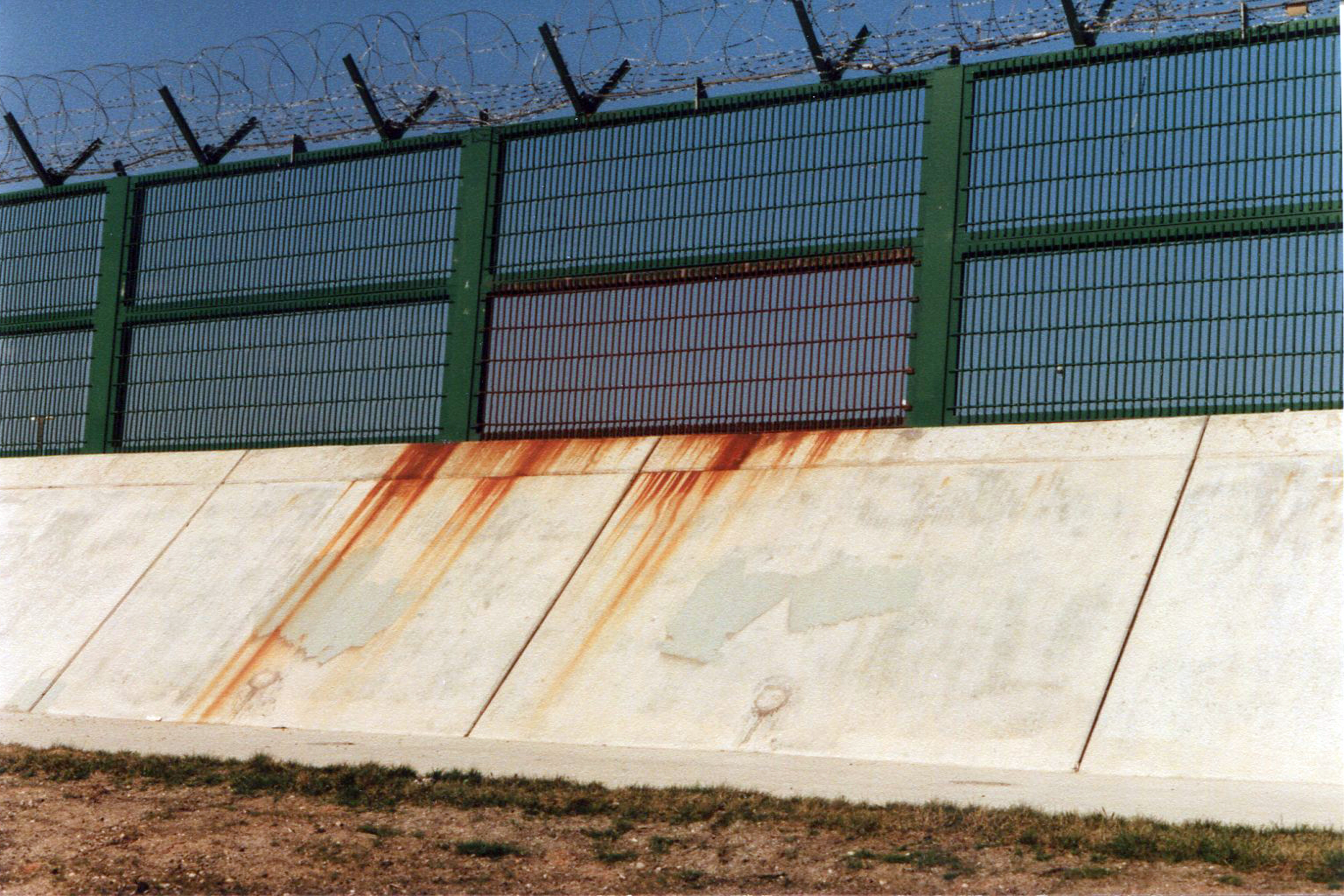
Former WAA fence

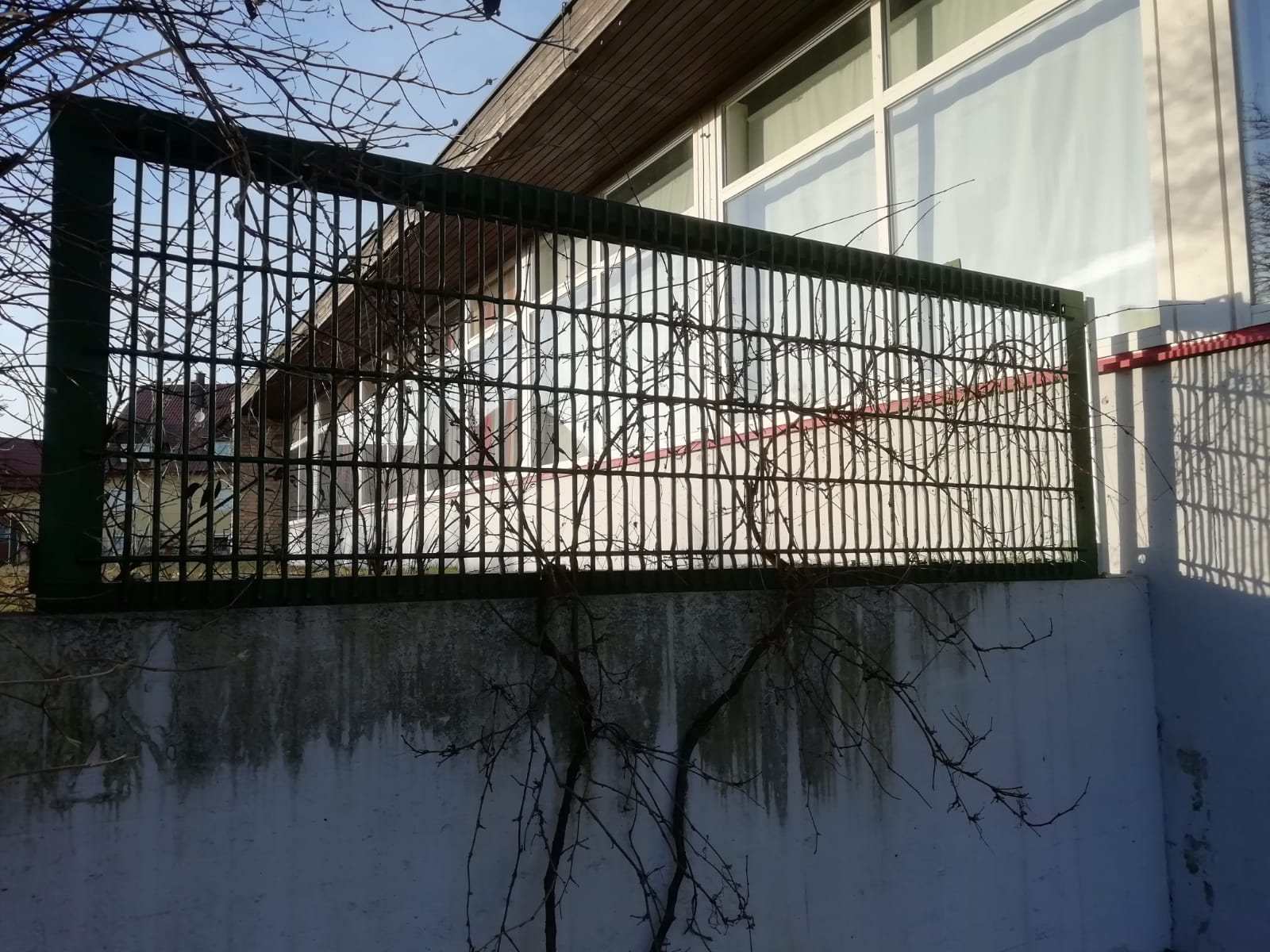
WAA construction fence element (Europa-Museum 2025)

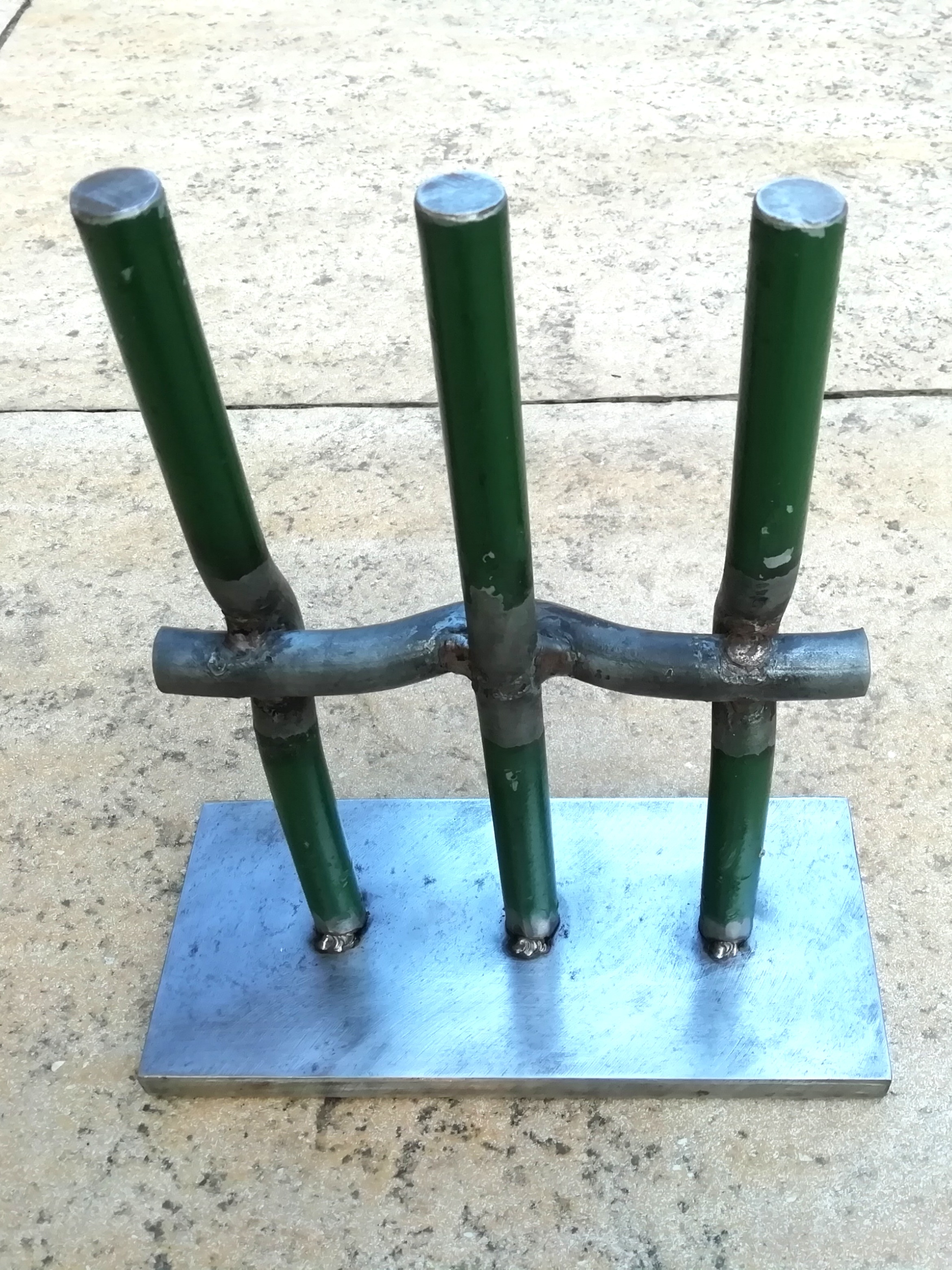
WAA fence paperweight

In 1986, the green protective fence around the WAA site was built. It was 4.8 km long, three meters high, and stood behind a 1.5-meter-deep and five-meter-wide, concrete-lined dry trench. The construction fence was additionally secured with razor wire. The WAA fence was highly politically charged, and many demonstrators tried to cut through it with hacksaws.

In 1990, the construction fence, which cost approximately 15 million DM, was demolished. State Parliament member Armin Weiß and the Green Party unsuccessfully petitioned the Bavarian State Parliament to preserve a section of the fence as a "contemporary historical monument for posterity" or as a "historical site." However, there are also various items such as desk butlers, paperweights, etc., which were made from the torn-down construction fence parts.

In 2018, an original WAA construction fence element was installed in front of the Temple Museum in Etsdorf (Freudenberg). The museum's founder, Wilhelm Koch (artist), had acquired it via eBay. A WAA table decoration and original construction fence elements are also on display at the Bavarian Police Museum in Ingolstadt. (more photos)

== Memorial Stone in Bregenz ==
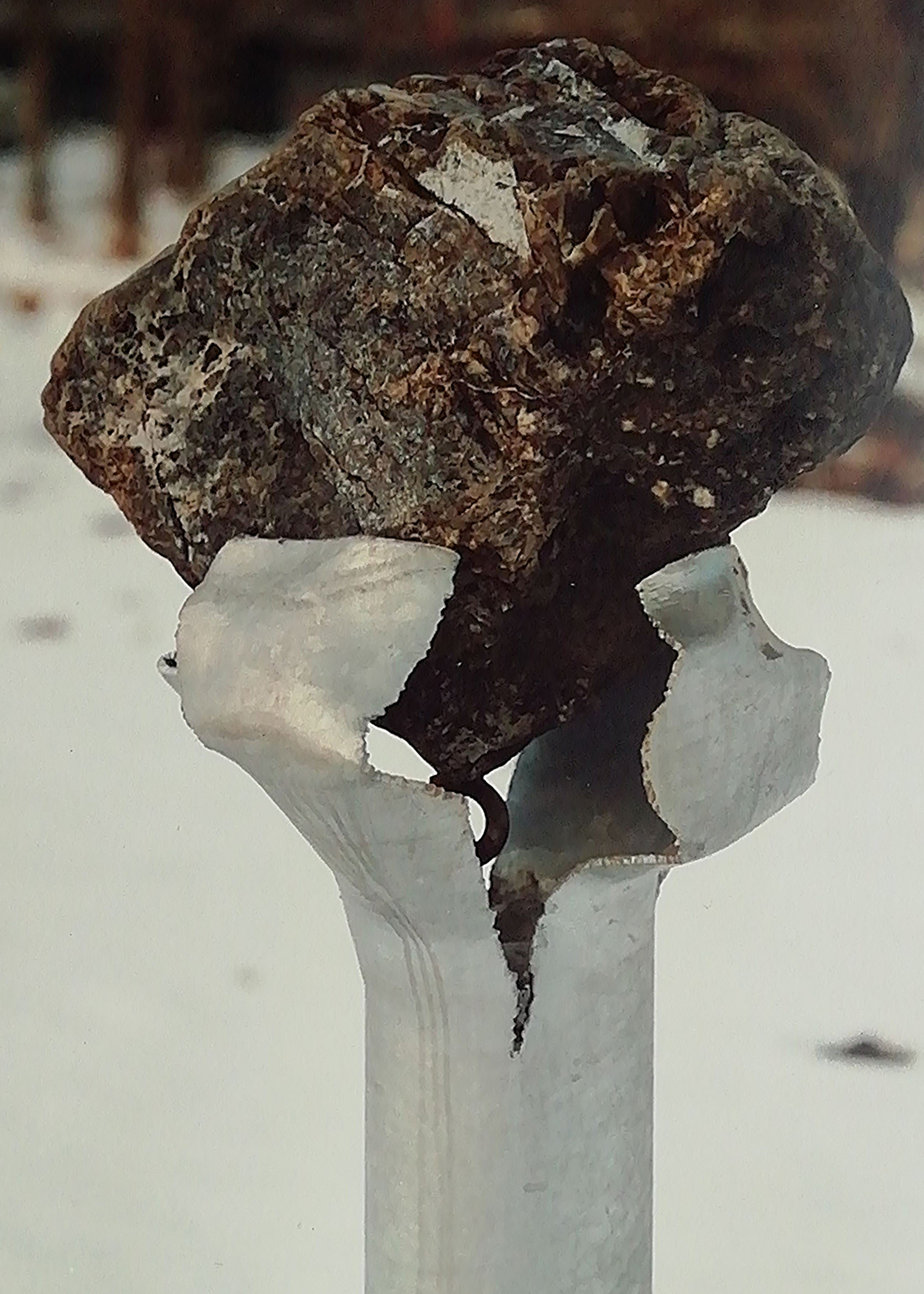
A Stone from Wackersdorf for Vorarlberg

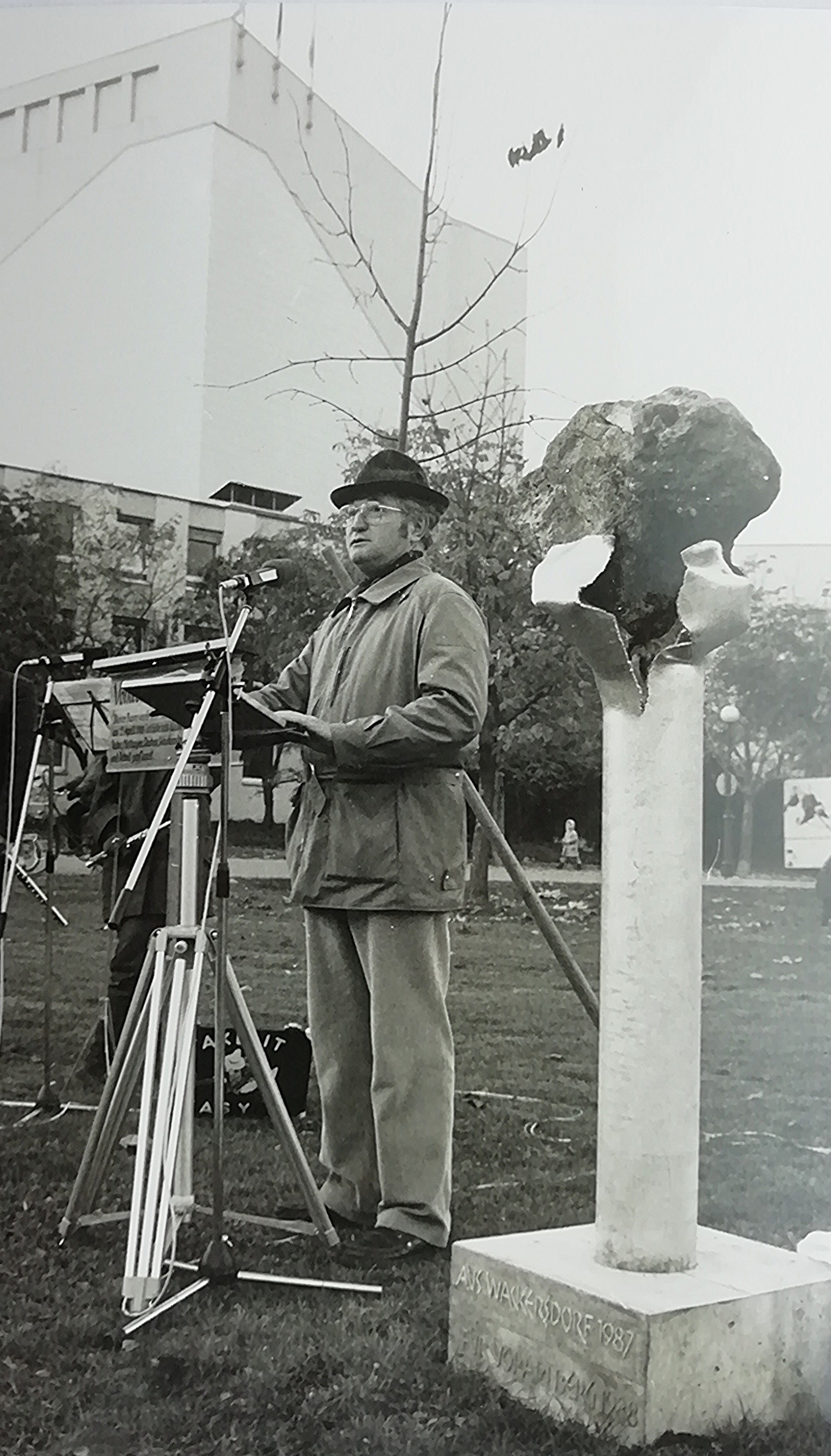
Catholic priest Leo Feichtmeier at the dedication in 1988 in Bregenz

A memorial stone from Wackersdorf for Vorarlberg was erected in 1988 in the lakeside park in front of the Bregenz Festival Hall in Austria. The Upper Palatinate Catholic priest Leo Feichtmeier dedicated the monument in November 1988. (more photos
Inscription:

From Wackersdorf 1987
for Vorarlberg 1988

== WAA construction fence in Salzburg ==
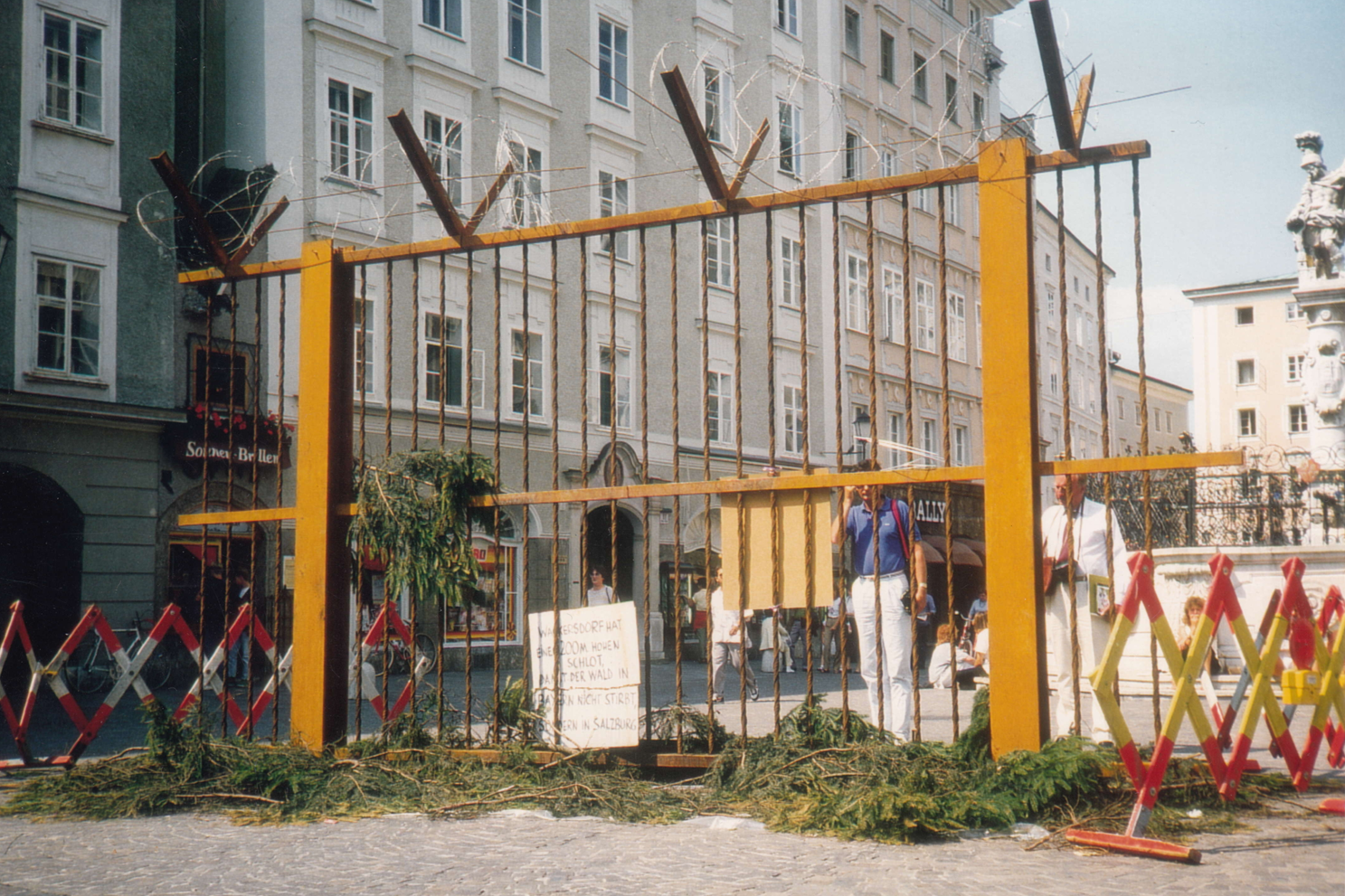
WAA construction fence on the Old Market Square in Salzburg (1986)

In 1986, Salzburg resident Richard Hörl erected a replica WAA construction fence element on the Old Market Square in Salzburg (Austria). It stood there for months as a memorial and public attraction. In July 1986, Salzburg's Mayor Josef Reschen and District Administrator Hans Schuierer climbed a ladder there and sealed the anti-nuclear partnership between Salzburg and the Schwandorf district with a handshake over the construction fence. - Due to massive Austrian resistance to the Bavarian WAA, the WAA conflict between Bavaria and Austria erupted. (more photos)

== Wackersdorf Memorial in Salzburg ==
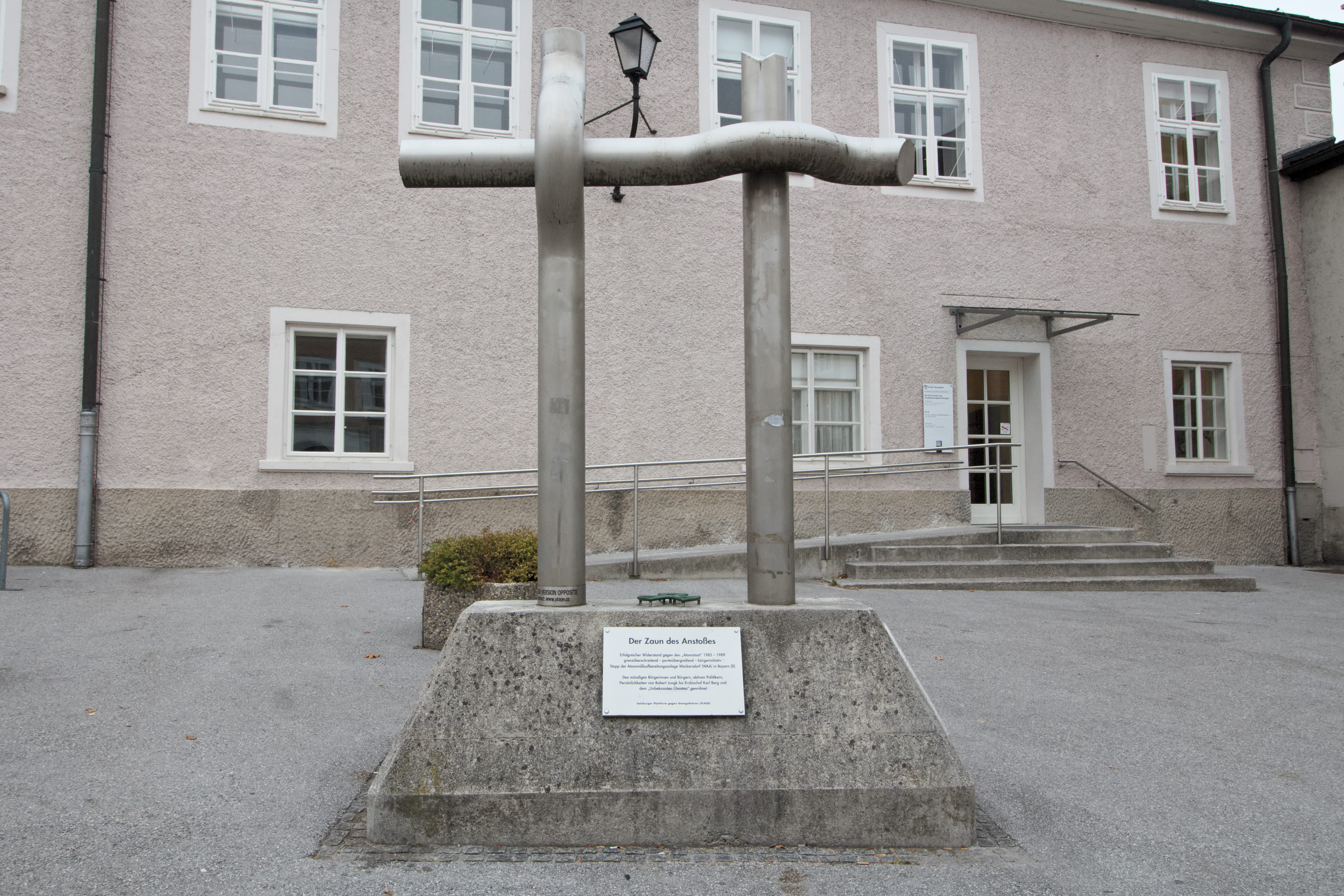
Wackersdorf Memorial in Salzburg

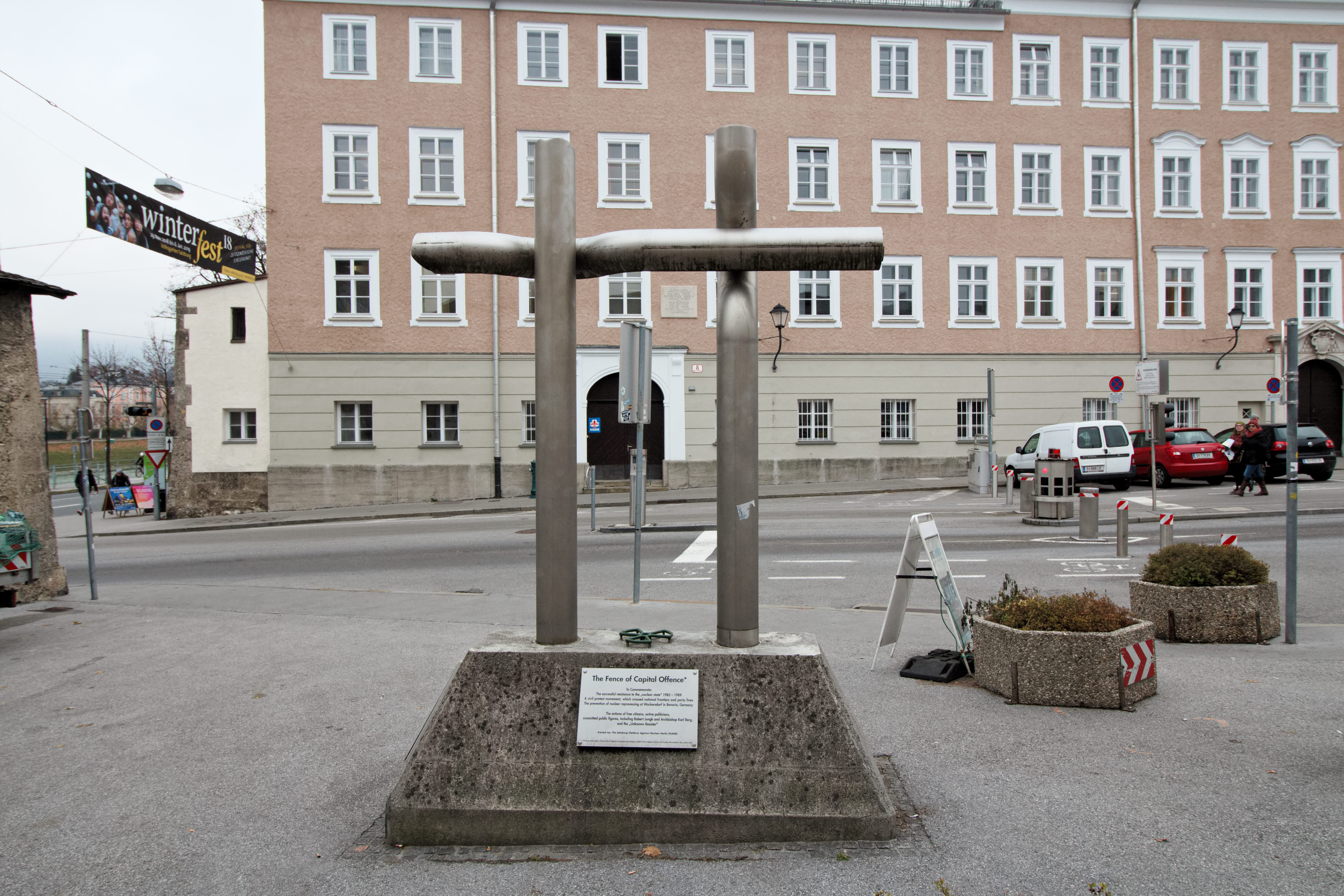
"The Fence of Capital Offence"

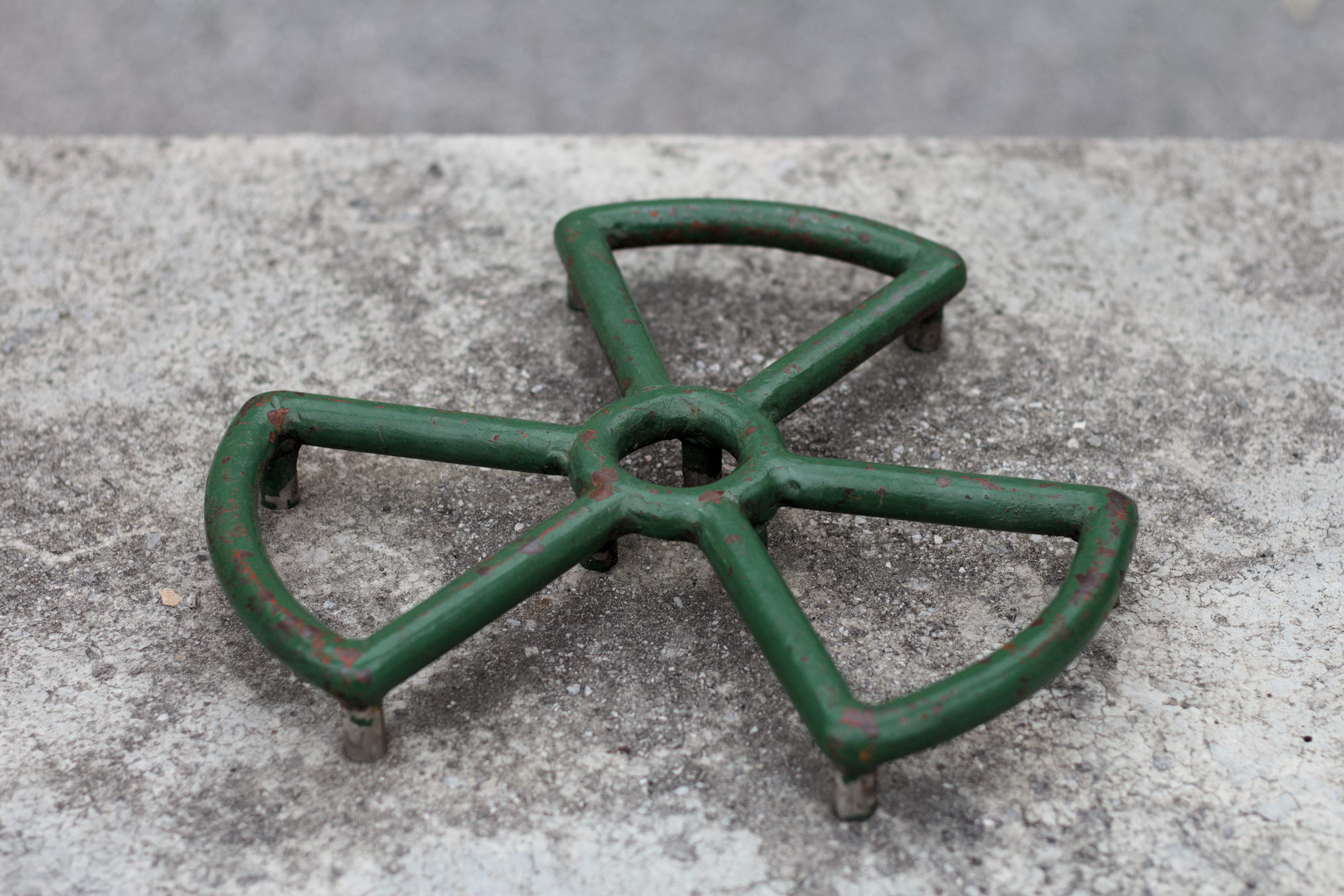
Original part from the WAA construction fence

The Wackersdorf Memorial (also known as the "Fence of Contention") stands in Mozartplatz in Salzburg, Austria. The 3.5 m high "Wackersdorf Memorial," which incorporates original parts of the construction fence surrounding the WAA (Reprocessing Plant), was erected on July 20, 2000, between Mozartsteg and Mozartplatz by Platform Against Nuclear Dangers Salzburg (PLAGE). Among those present were Hans Schuierer, Josef Reschen, and the Mayor of Salzburg, Heinz Schaden. (more photos)

Bilingual (German/English) inscriptions on three metal plaques:

The Fence of Capital Offence*
To Commemorate:
The successful resistance to the „nuclear state“ 1985–1989
A civil protest movement, which crossed national frontiers and party lines. The prevention of nuclear reprocessing at Wackersdorf in Bavaria, Germany
The actions of free citizens, active politicians,
committed public figures, including Robert Jungk and Archbishop Karl Berg, and the „Unknown Resister“
Erected by: The Salzburg Platform Against Nuclear Perils (PLAGE)
* The fence, which made a fortress of the Wackersdorf construction site, became a symbol of the arrogance of power and of police state methods in the „nuclear state“.

Nuclear Resisters Monument
Never before had there been such a massive transnational resistance movement to a technocratic superproject. More than 420.000 German and 420.000 Austrian written objections wrought the downfall of the project. Austria's antinuclear foreign policy was born here.
This was a critical blow against the plutonium industry and its attendant problems: ´
* continuous radioactive contamination of the environment
* frequent transport of nuclear waste
* the risk of sabotage and the misuse of plutonium by nation states and by terrorist groups; and
* the erosion of civil liberties through the use of anti-democratic enforcement and surveillance methods.
