= Cross of Wackersdorf =

German sculpture

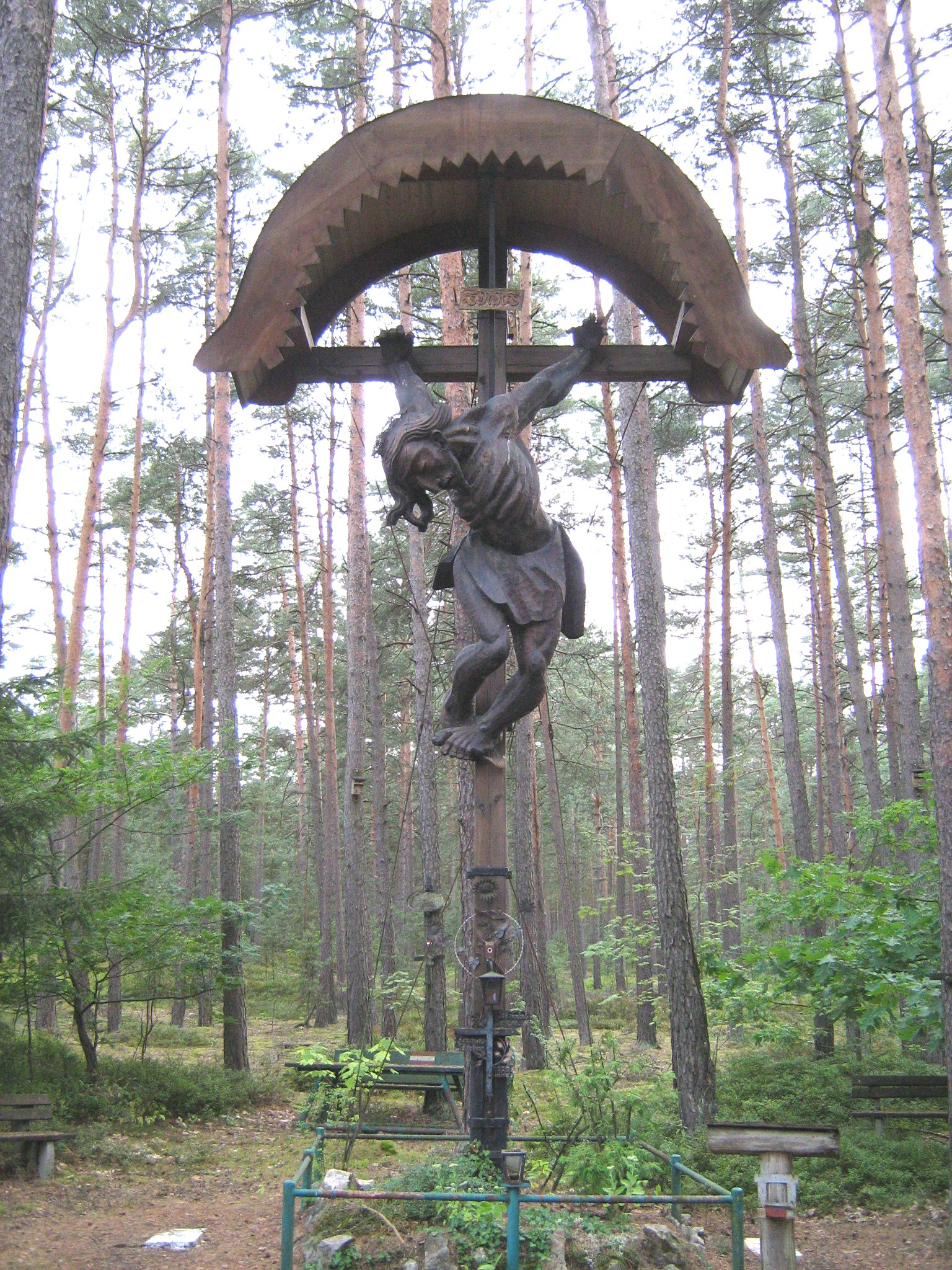
- Kreuz von Wackersdorf (2013)
- Location: Bavaria, Germany
- Coordinates: 49°18′47.4″N 12°14′40.6″E
- Designer: Stefan Preisl
- Type: WAA-Protest-Cross
- Material: Wood
- Height: 7 m (23 ft)
- Opening date: 5 May 1986

The Cross of Wackersdorf (German: Das Kreuz von Wackersdorf) is a protest cross against the nuclear Wackersdorf reprocessing plant (WAA) in Bavaria. It stands next to the Franziskus-Marterl (St. Francis wayside shrine) near the former WAA construction site in the Taxölderner Forest, east of Wackersdorf.

== History ==
=== Stolen Cross of Wackersdorf ===
From 26 to 29 December 1985, the Burglengenfeld wood sculptor Stefan Preisl carved a 1.60 m tall figure of Christ from a spruce trunk in freezing temperatures. The figure was attached to a ten-meter-high spruce cross and erected in the WAA protest village Free Republic of Wackerland. The crucifix, consecrated by the catholic priest Andreas Schlagenhaufer, stood for a week. During the clearing of the shantytown on 7 January 1986, it was sawn off by the police and carried away. A police chaplain had previously desecrated the cross and overseen its dignified transport. The Christ figure, returned shortly afterward, was taken by demonstrators to the Franziskus-Marterl and erected there. On the night of 20 February 1986, the Christ figure disappeared. Only the broken hands remained.

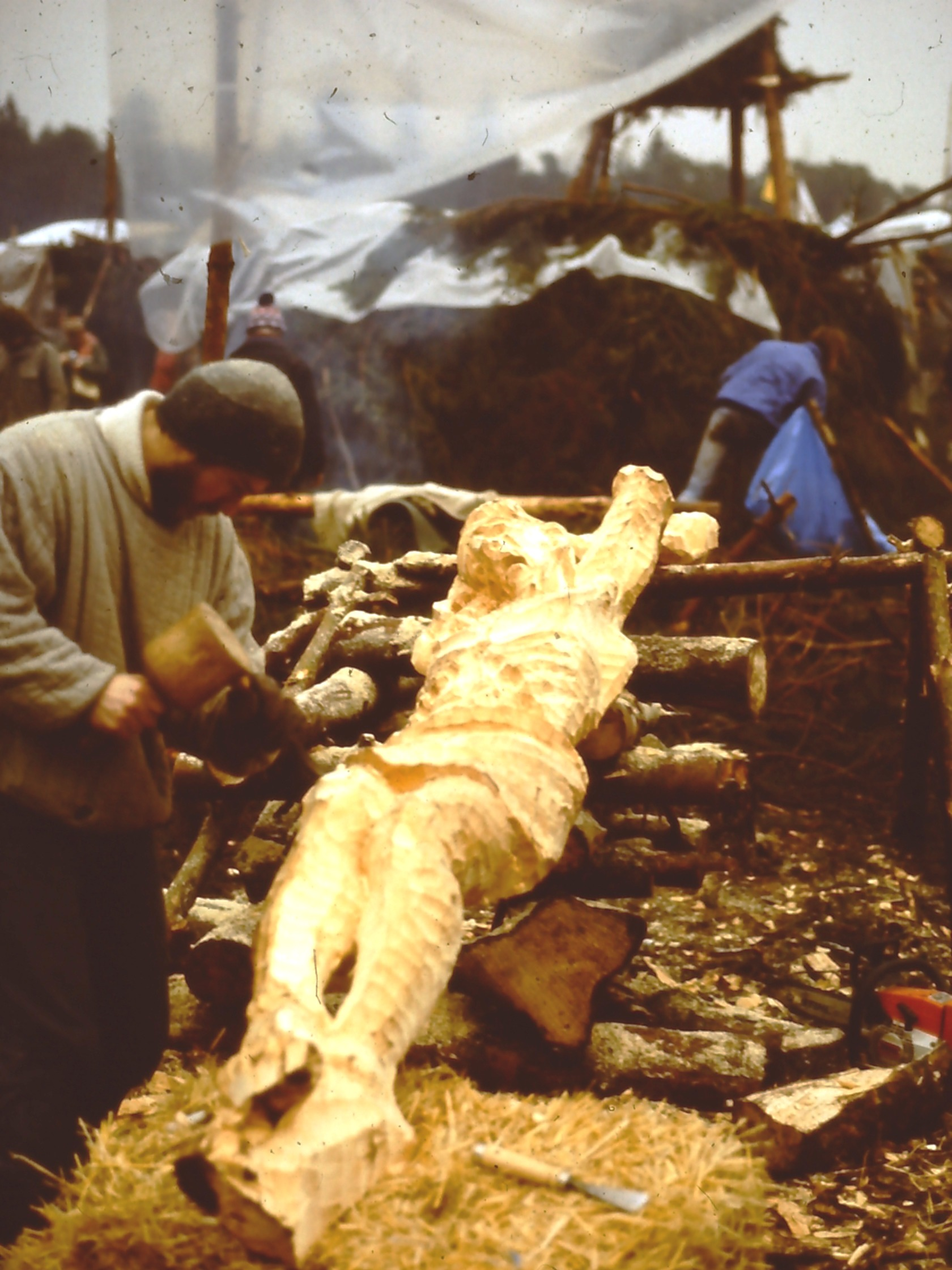
creation

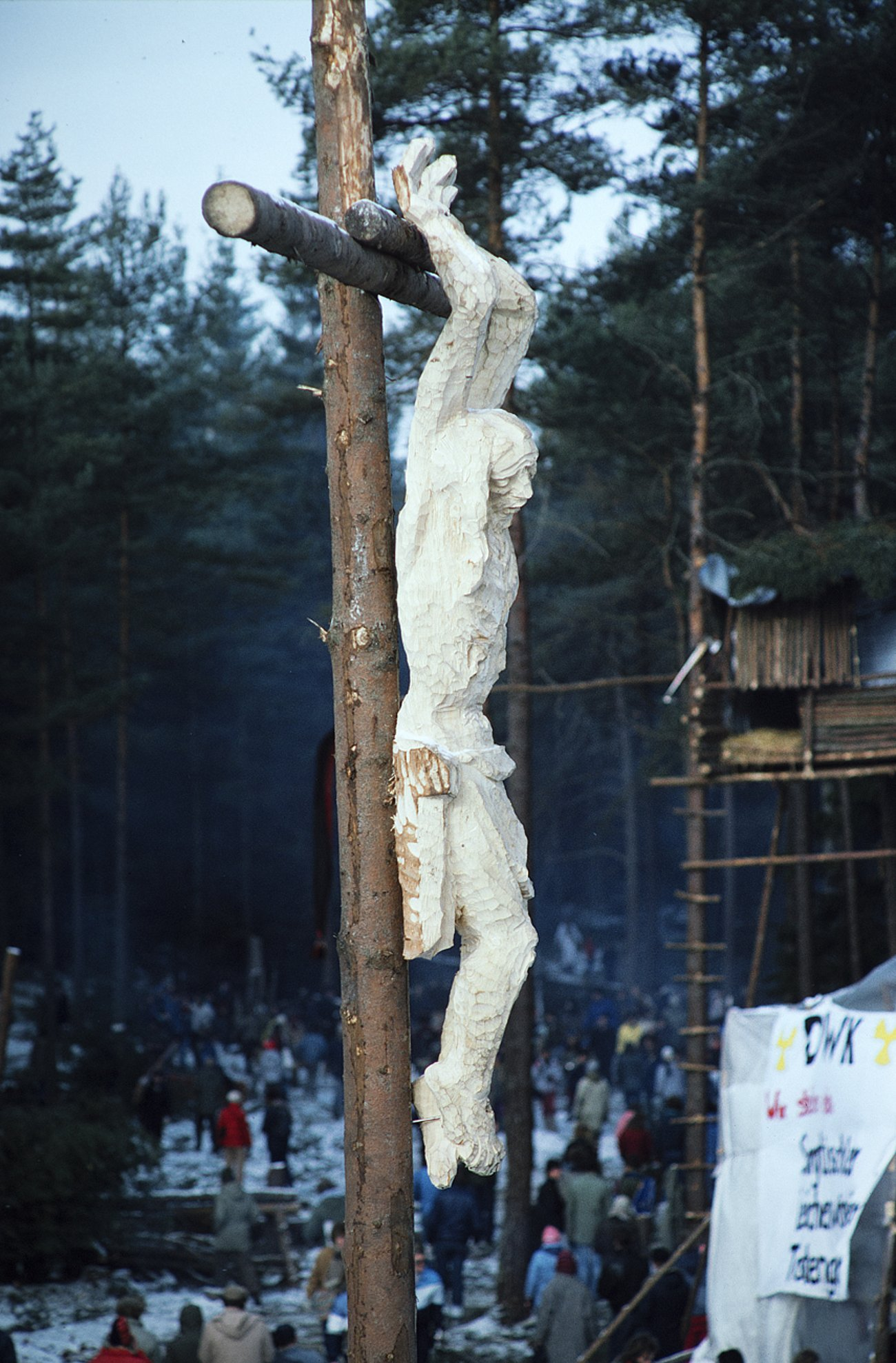
Wacker-land cross

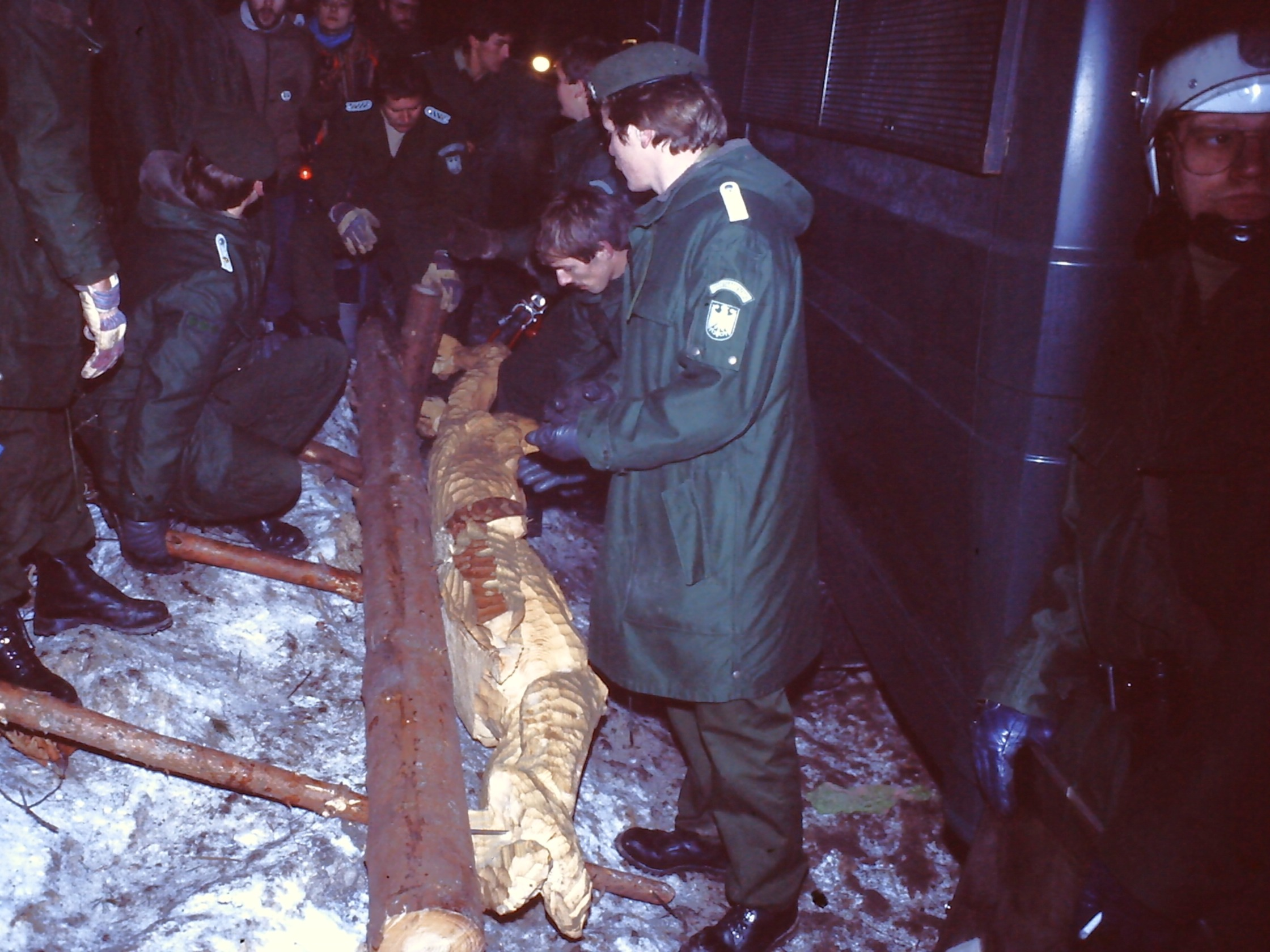
removal by police

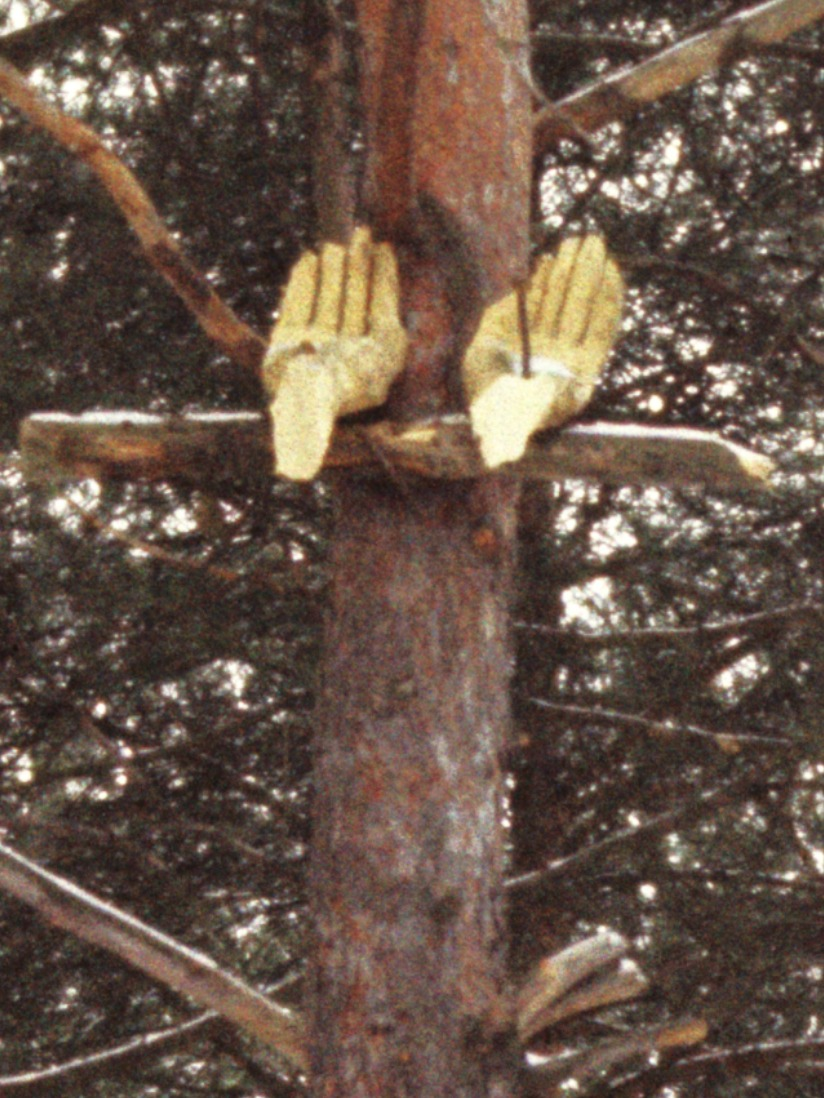
theft

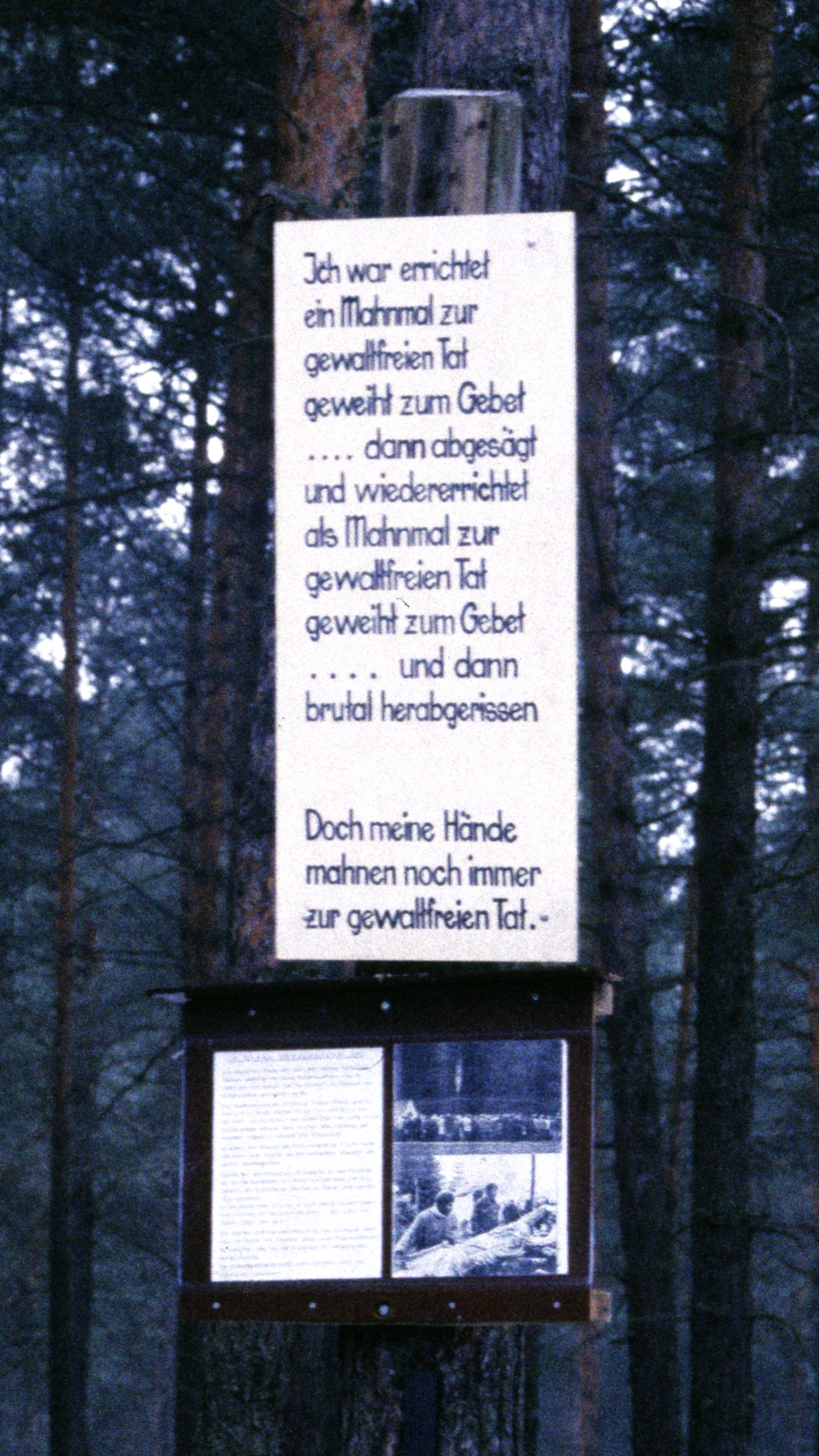
info

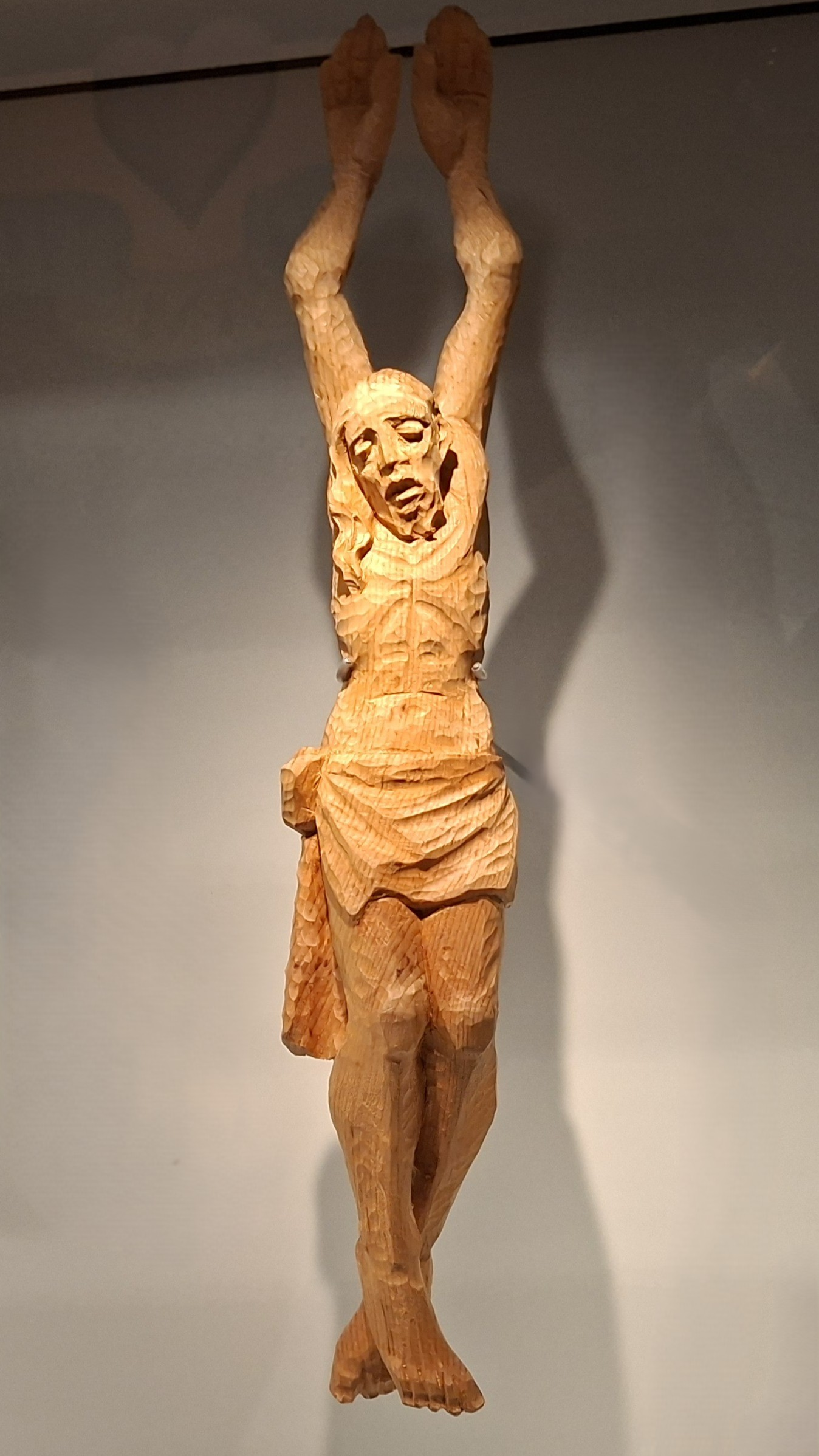
model

=== Cross of Wackersdorf ===
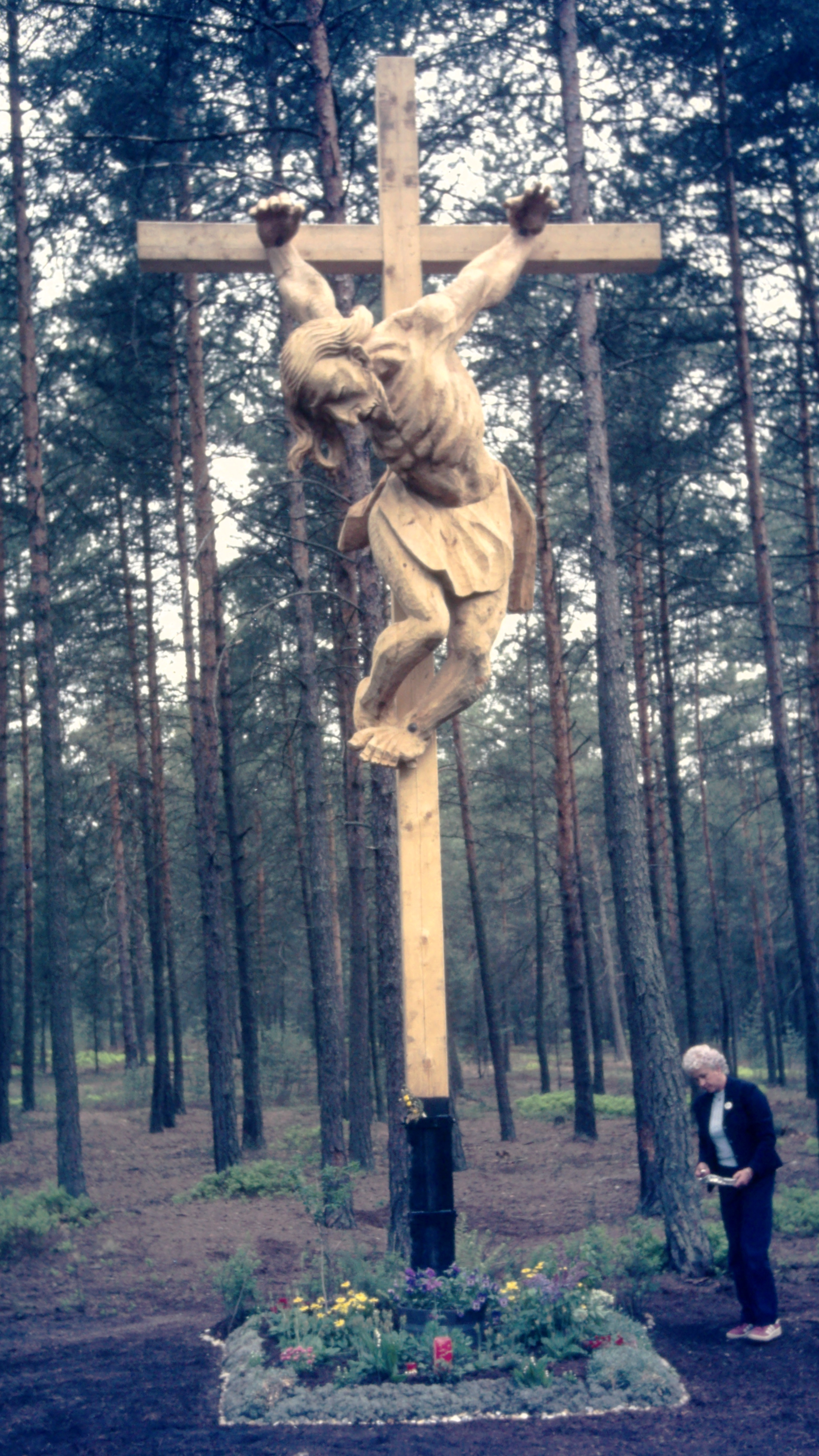
Cross of Wackersdorf (1986)

When wood sculptor Preisl learned in February 1986 that his Christ figure had been torn from the tree, he began to make a new, more imposing cross. He didn't want the new, multi-ton cross to be so easily taken and made to disappear. He bought massive blocks of Weymouth pine (pinus strobus) and glued them together. Preisl worked in his parents' garden until Easter. The second Christ figure was significantly larger and heavier than its predecessor. Meanwhile, a carpenter friend constructed the wooden cross for the corpus. The cross was transported by low-loader to the Franziskus-Marterl, where steelworkers from the Maxhütte steelworks had erected iron supports. Fifty men used steel cables to raise the enormous crucifix. On Easter Sunday 1986, when 100,000 people demonstrated at the Easter March in Wackersdorf, the seven-meter-high crucifix stood next to the Franziskus-Marterl. The members of the Franziskus-Marterl community built a round roof over the cross and continue to ensure its upkeep to this day.

== Artist – Stefan Preisl ==
Stefan Preisl (born 1956) trained as a wood sculptor starting in 1976 and has worked as a freelance sculptor in his hometown of Burglengenfeld since 1981. From the beginning, he participated in the resistance actions against the WAA (nuclear reprocessing plant) in Wackersdorf. Later, Preisl also worked as an arborist and tree climber. In 2003, Preisl, together with the artist group "Dünger" (Fertilizer), created the Burglengenfeld Art Forest Garden, a year-round open-air art exhibition.

== Location ==
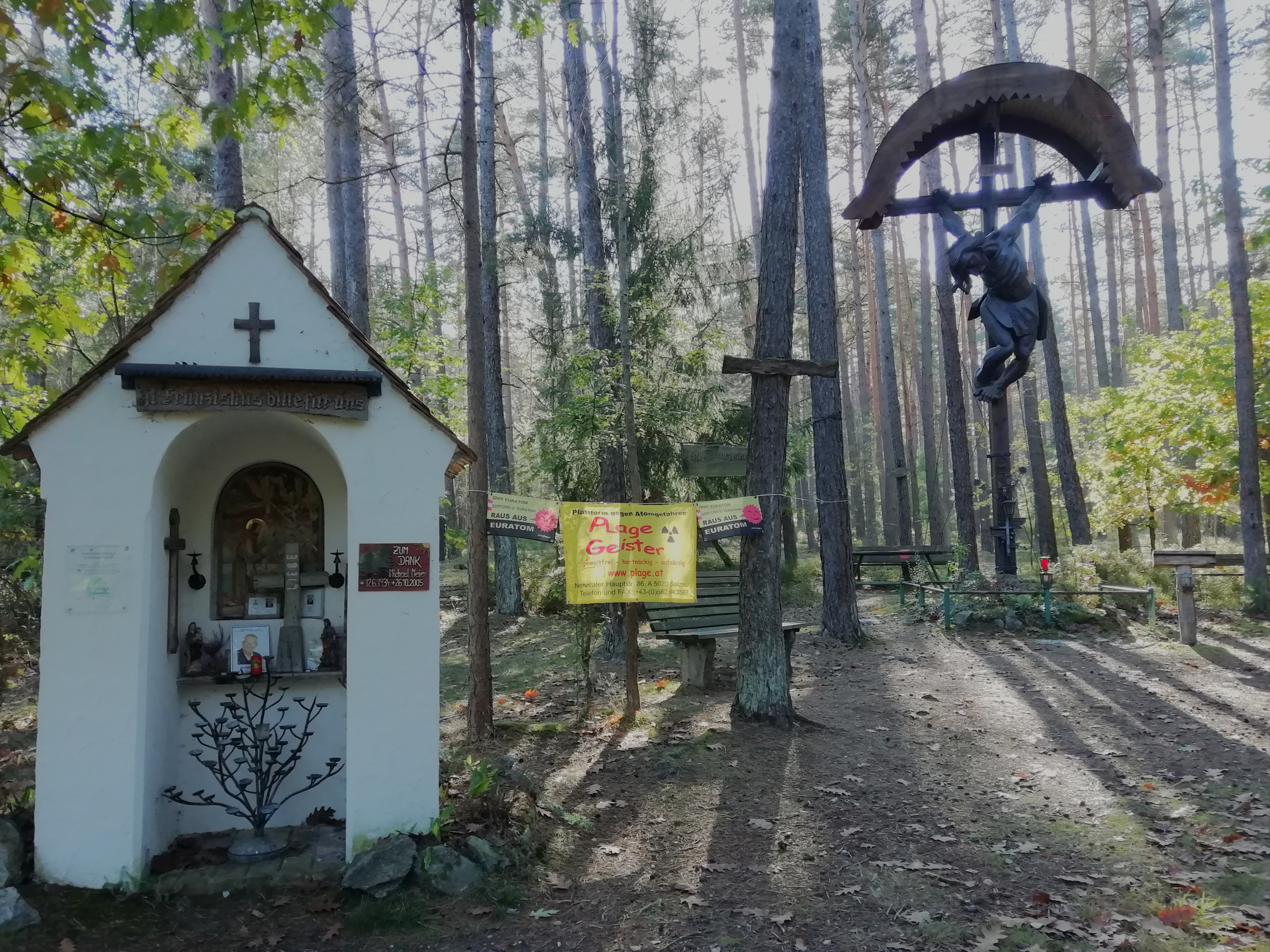
Franziskus-Marterl (2025)

The Wackersdorf Cross is part of the Franziskus-Marterl (St. Francis wayside shrine ensemble), which includes the St. Francis Chapel, the Stolen Cross of Wackersdorf, the Torn Man sculpture, the memorial cross for the Stations of the Cross from Wackersdorf to Gorleben, the "WAA-NO"-heart, the Bow of God in thanksgiving for the cancellation of the WAA, and other memorial plaques and protest trees. The Franziskus-Marterl is located on the former property of Michael Meier in the district of Altenschwand (Bodenwöhr).

== Documentaries ==
Interviews with the artist Stefan Preisl (HdBG 2015)

- Erection of the wooden cross with the first Christ figure he carved in the Free Republic of Wackerland shantytown and its removal by the police during the eviction.
- Creation and erection of the second Christ figure made of Weymouth pine (Pinus strobus) wood, which can still be seen today at the Franziskus-Marterl in the Taxöldern Forest, east of Wackersdorf.
- Violence by the demonstrators, especially against property, and the use of force by the police, particularly by the Berlin special unit in Wackersdorf.
- The demonstrators' attitude against the Wackersdorf nuclear reprocessing plant (WAA), which did not even allow for the possibility of failure.
- The use of water cannons, CN/CS gas, and police violence in Wackersdorf led to the radicalization of the population.

More documents:

- 40 years ago: Environmental protests in Wackersdorf, 3 min

== See also ==
- List of memorials related to the Wackersdorf reprocessing plant
