= Free Republic of Wackerland =

Micronation in Germany

Free Republic of Wackerland Freie Republik Wackerland
- Micronation (unrecognized entity)
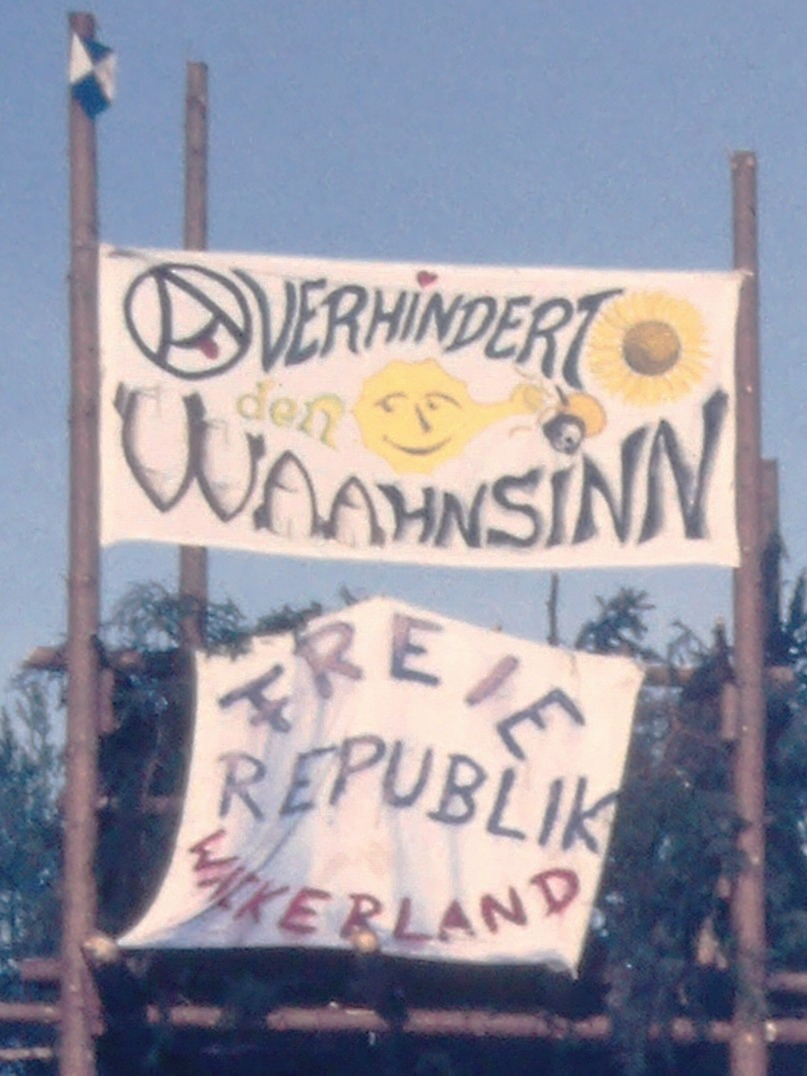
- "Verhindert den WAAHNSINN" (Prevent the madness) "Freie Republik Wackerland"
- Location: 49°19′24″N 12°13′50″E
- Area claimed: Camp in WAA-Wackersdorf, West Germany
- Type: Protest camp
- Dates claimed: 21 December 1985–7 January 1986

The Free Republic of Wackerland (German: Freie Republik Wackerland) was a hut village on the construction site of the Wackersdorf reprocessing plant (WAA) in Bavaria (Germany). The builders intended to obstruct the construction of the nuclear facility and the clearing of the surrounding forest by occupying the site. The protest village in the Taxölden Forest (Bodenwöhr) existed for 18 days, from December 21, 1985, to January 7, 1986, and was cleared by a large contingent of police and Federal Border Guards.

== Background ==
On February 4, 1985, the German Society for the Reprocessing of Nuclear Fuels (Deutsche Gesellschaft für Wiederaufarbeitung von Kernbrennstoffen) selected Wackersdorf as the site for the WAA (nuclear reprocessing plant). However, Hans Schuierer, the district administrator of Schwandorf, refused to grant the necessary water and building permits, whereupon the Bavarian State Parliament passed the "Lex Schuierer" on July 23, 1985. The Bavarian Ministry of the Environment then issued the first partial construction permit on September 27, 1985. On November 11, 1985, the Upper Palatinate government, exercising its new right of self-administration, was also able to issue the required permits in place of the Schwandorf district office. On December 10, 1985, the Bavarian Administrative Court approved the clearing of the Taxöldern Forest, and on December 11, 1985, DWK immediately began the clearing work. As early as August 1985, demonstrators attempted an initial occupation of the construction site, but it was cleared by the police within a few hours. The construction of a "friendship house" was intended to be a test before the start of the clearing.

== Free Republic of Wackerland ==
On December 21, 1985 (four days before Christmas), the clearing work was halted and a "Christmas truce" was declared. As soon as the police withdrew, approximately 400 WAA opponents reoccupied the construction site and began building huts in freezing temperatures. Thus, the "Free Republic of Wackerland" (named after the Free Republic of Wendland, which existed in 1980) was established, featuring numerous huts, tents, tree houses, log cabins, observation towers, and more. Building materials were scattered throughout the cleared forest, and thousands of locals supported the hut dwellers with building materials, tools, food, water, and all necessities, offering showers and washing facilities or even helping with hut construction themselves. Gradually, over 150 huts and tents were built during the 18 days, and the village's infrastructure was continuously expanded.

=== Huts and facilities ===
Over the course of 18 days, more than 150 huts and tents were gradually built, and the village's infrastructure was continuously expanded.

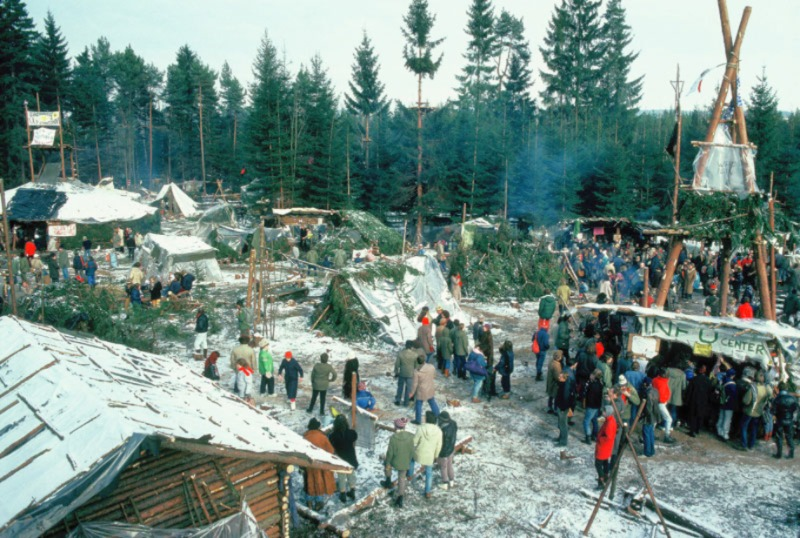
Village center

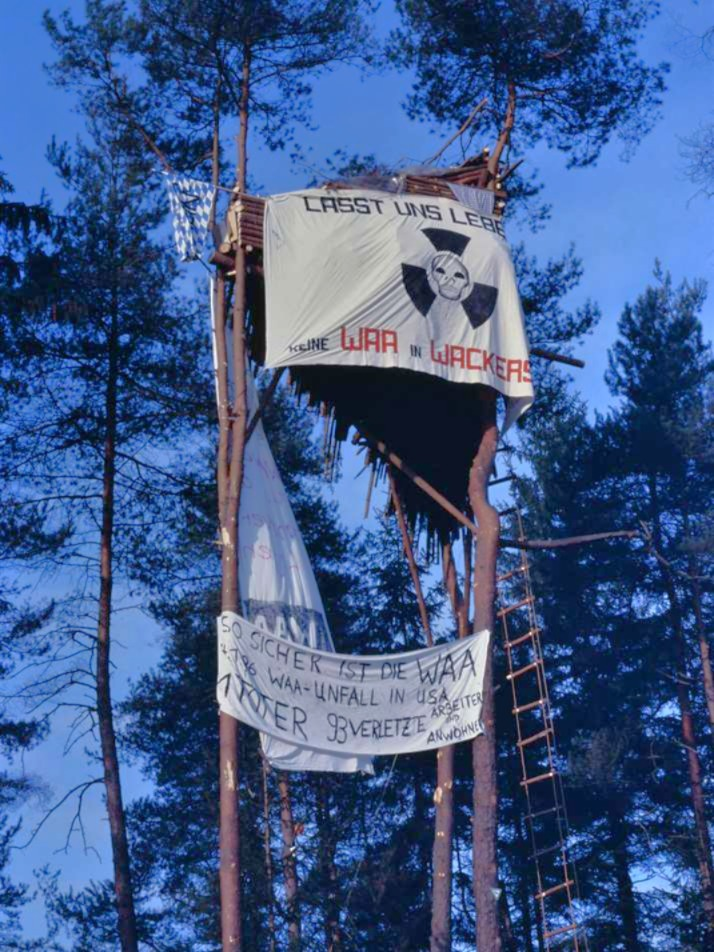
Treehouse

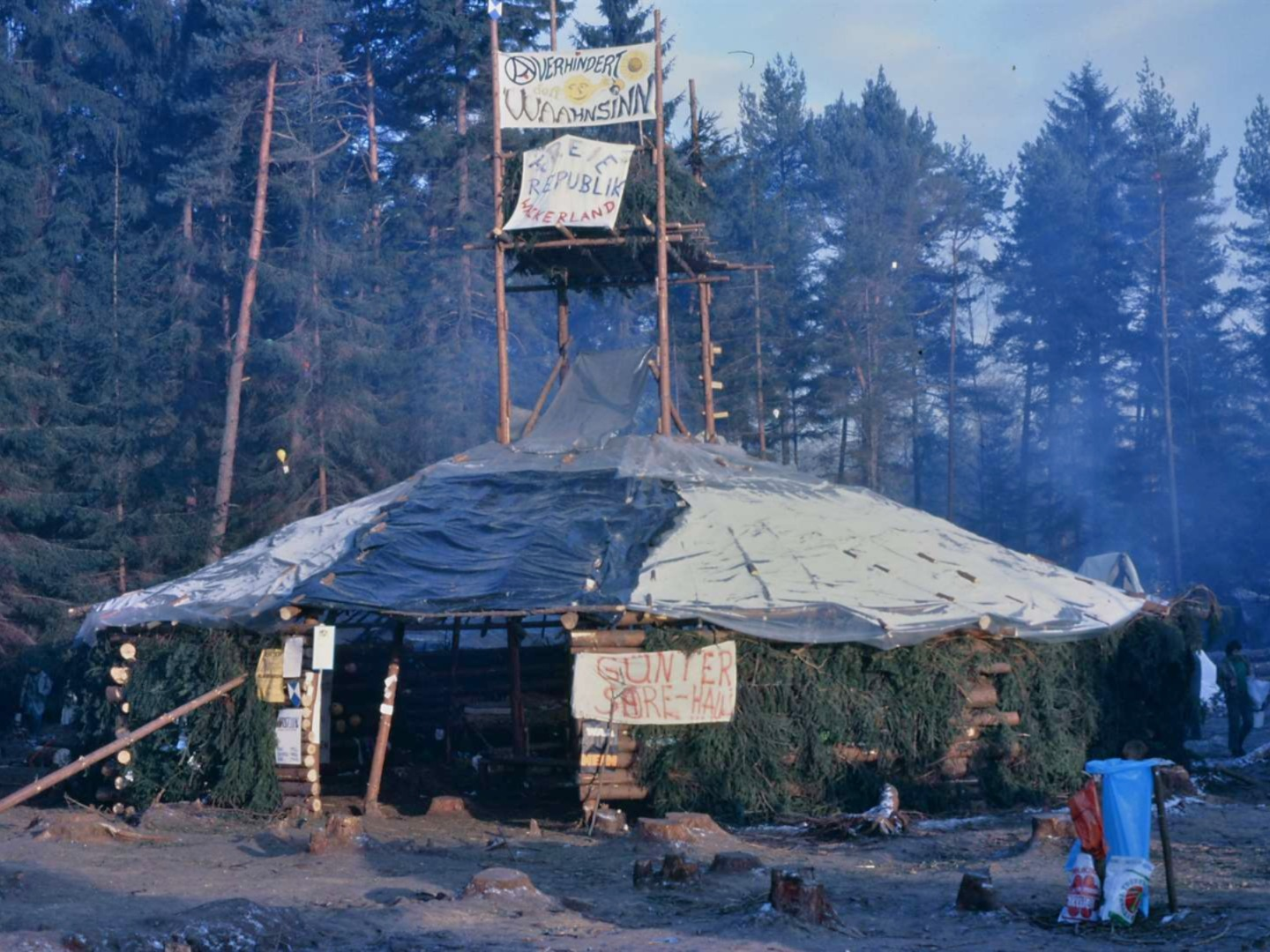
Günter Sare house

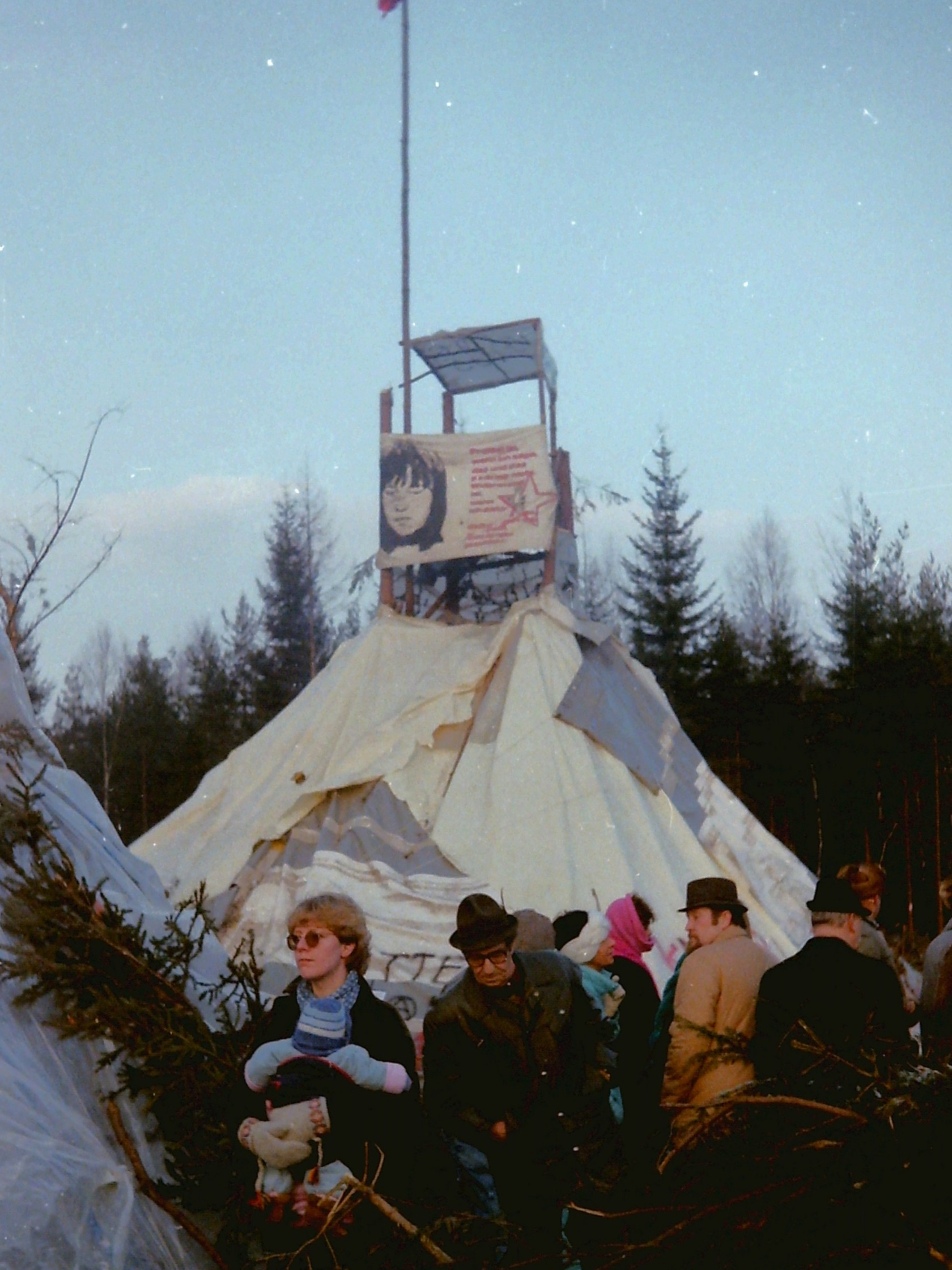
Meinhof hut

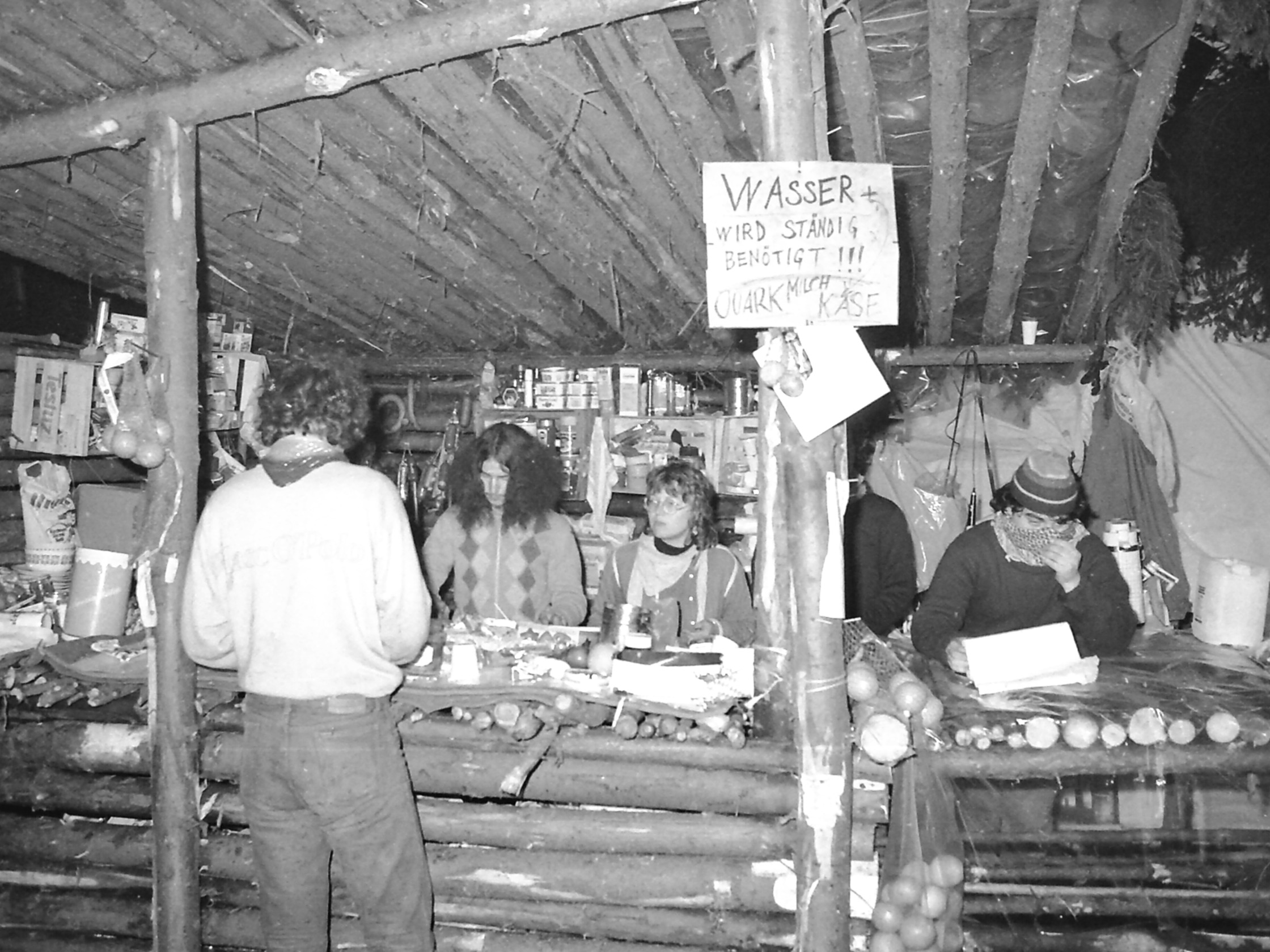
Supply hut

=== Village cross ===
From December 26 to 29, 1985, the Burglengenfeld wood sculptor Stefan Preisl carved a 1.60 m tall figure of Christ from a spruce trunk in freezing temperatures. The figure was attached to a ten-meter-high spruce cross and erected in the Wackerland hut village. The crucifix, consecrated by the catholic priest Andreas Schlagenhaufer, stood for a week. During the clearing of the shantytown on January 7, 1986, it was sawn off by the police and carried away. A police chaplain had previously desecrated the cross and overseen its dignified transport. The Christ figure, returned shortly afterward, was taken by demonstrators to the Franziskus-Marterl and erected there. On the night of February 20, 1986, the Christ figure disappeared. Only the broken hands remained. Shortly after the theft, Stefan Preisl carved the Cross of Wackersdorf.

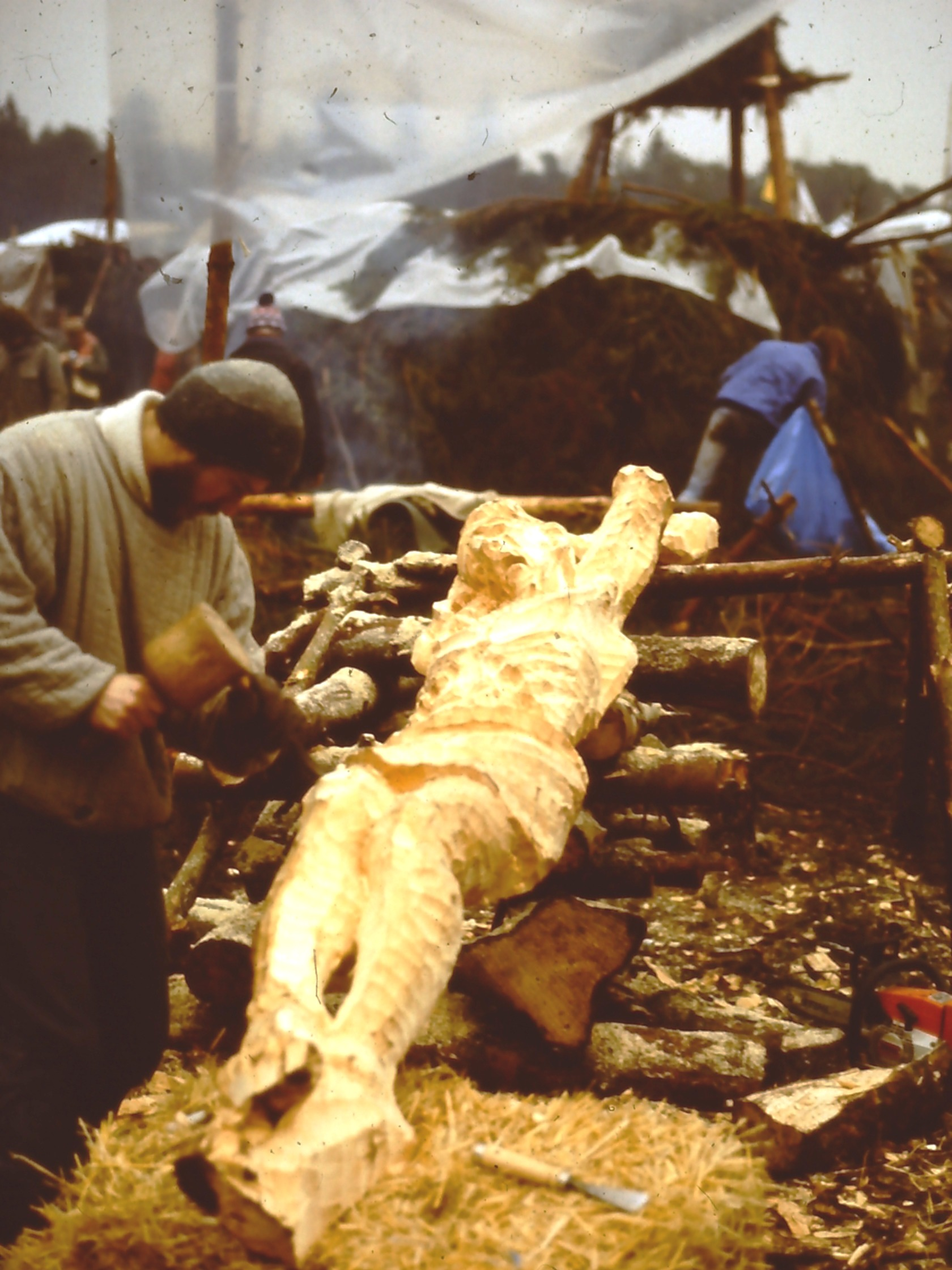
creation

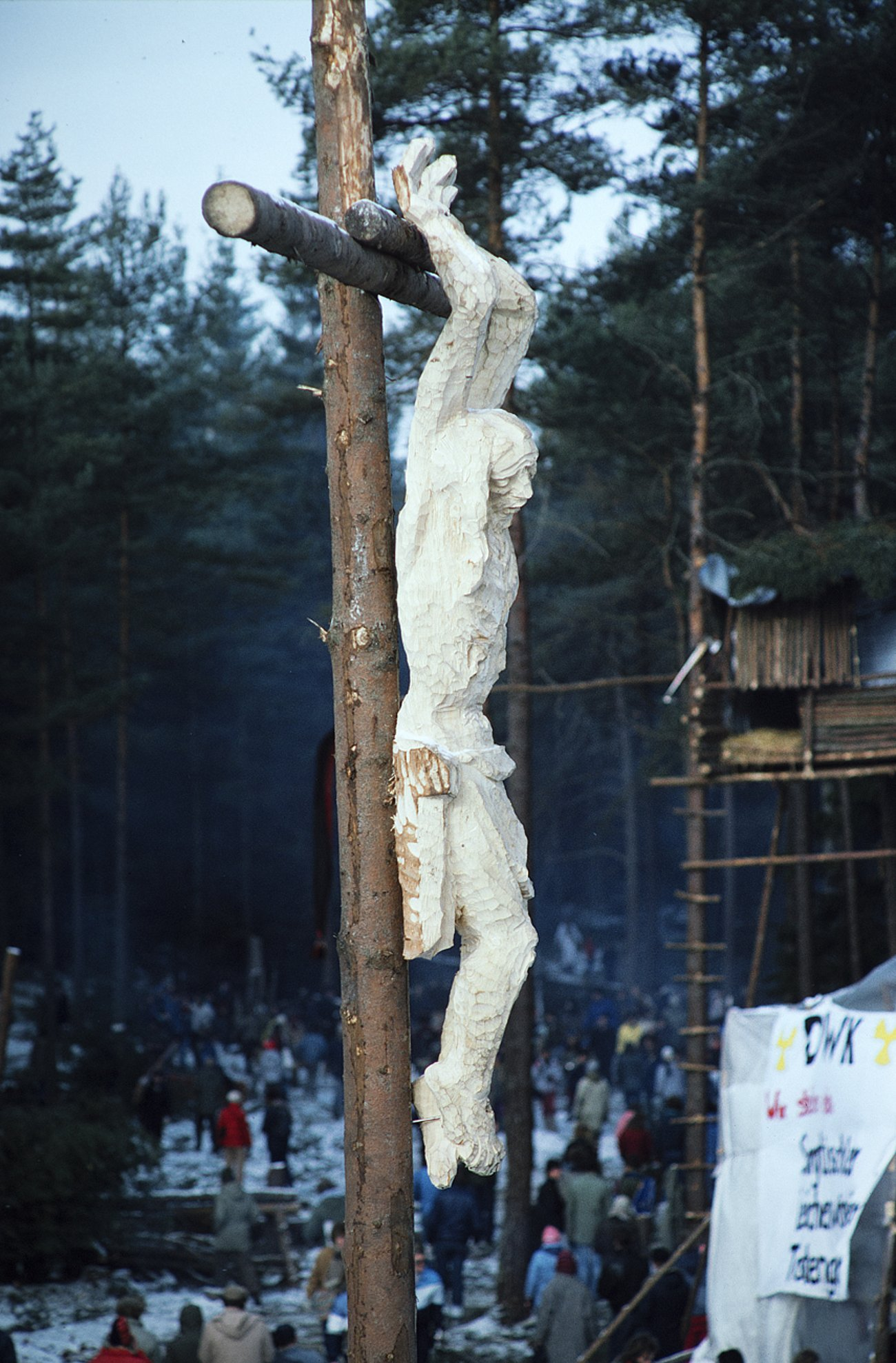
Wacker-land cross

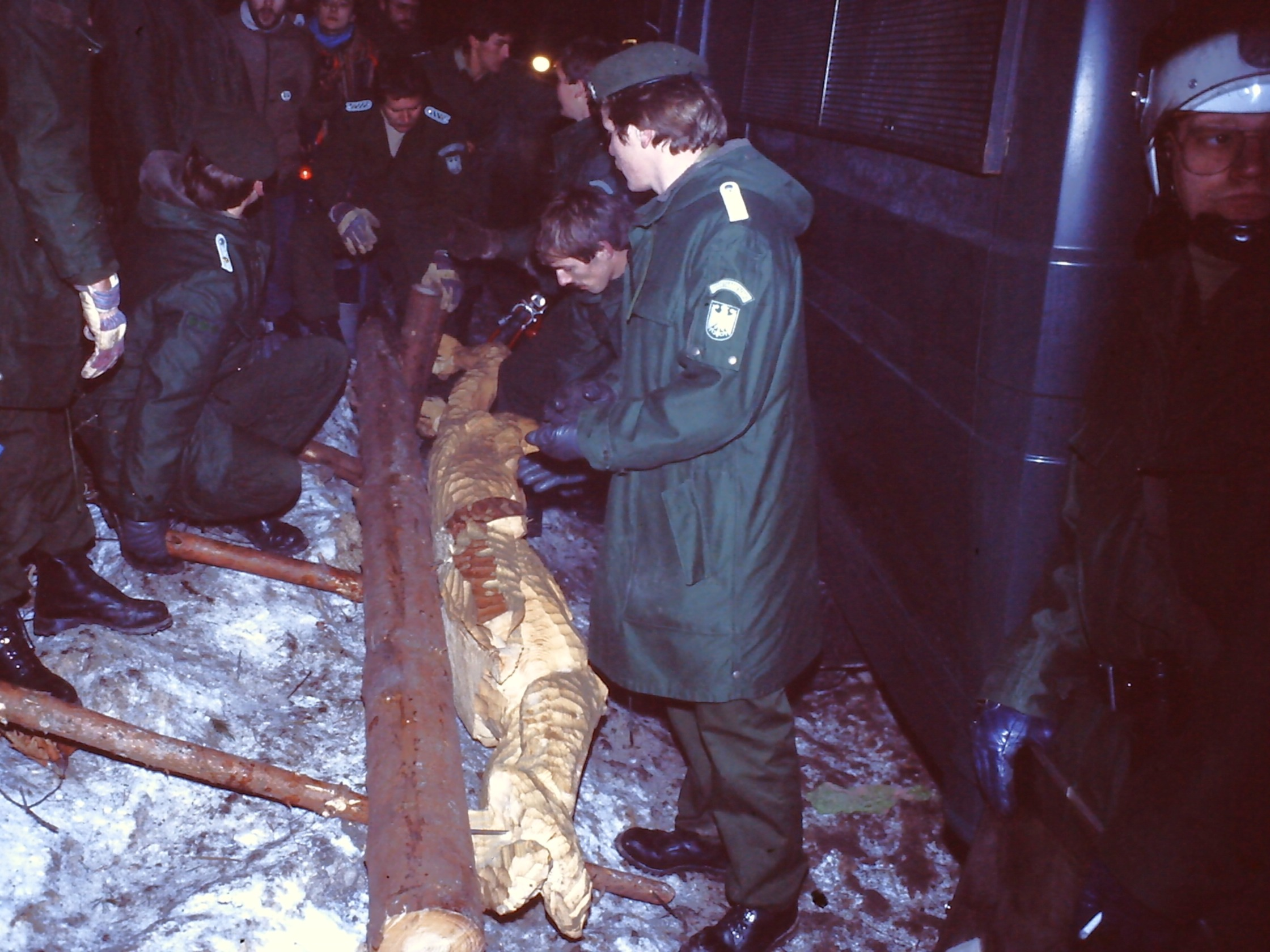
removal by police

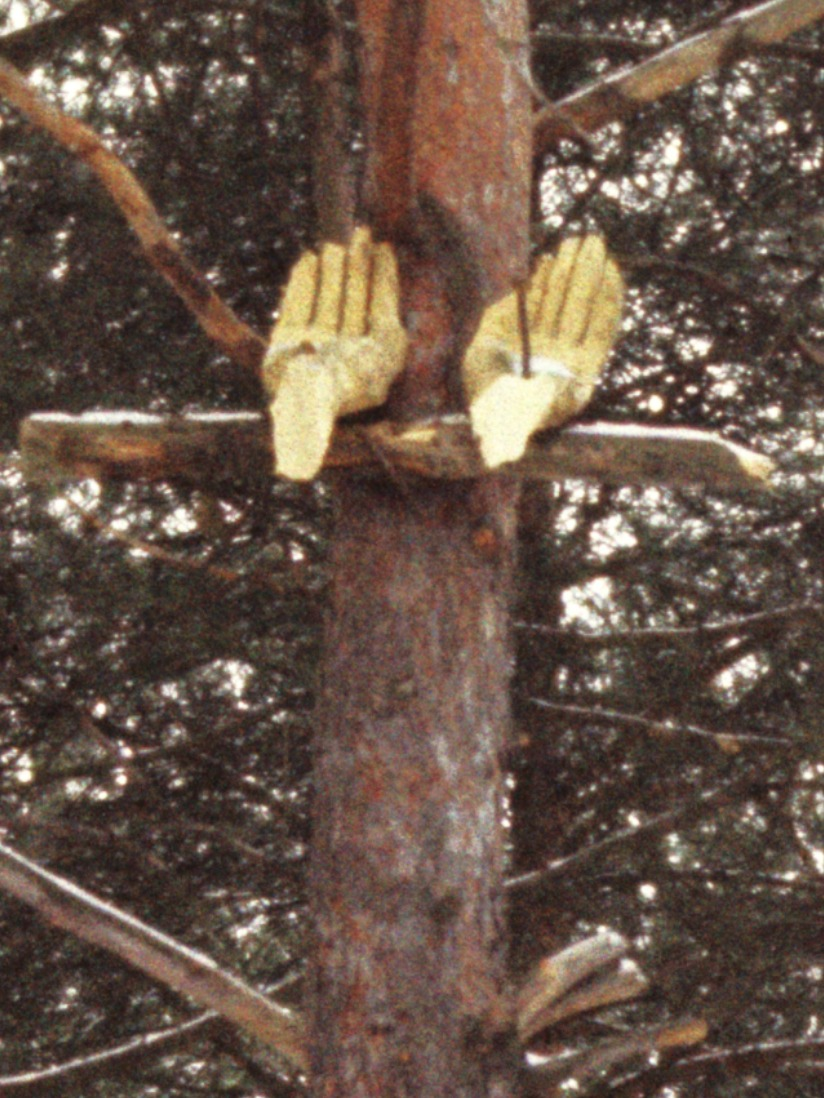
theft

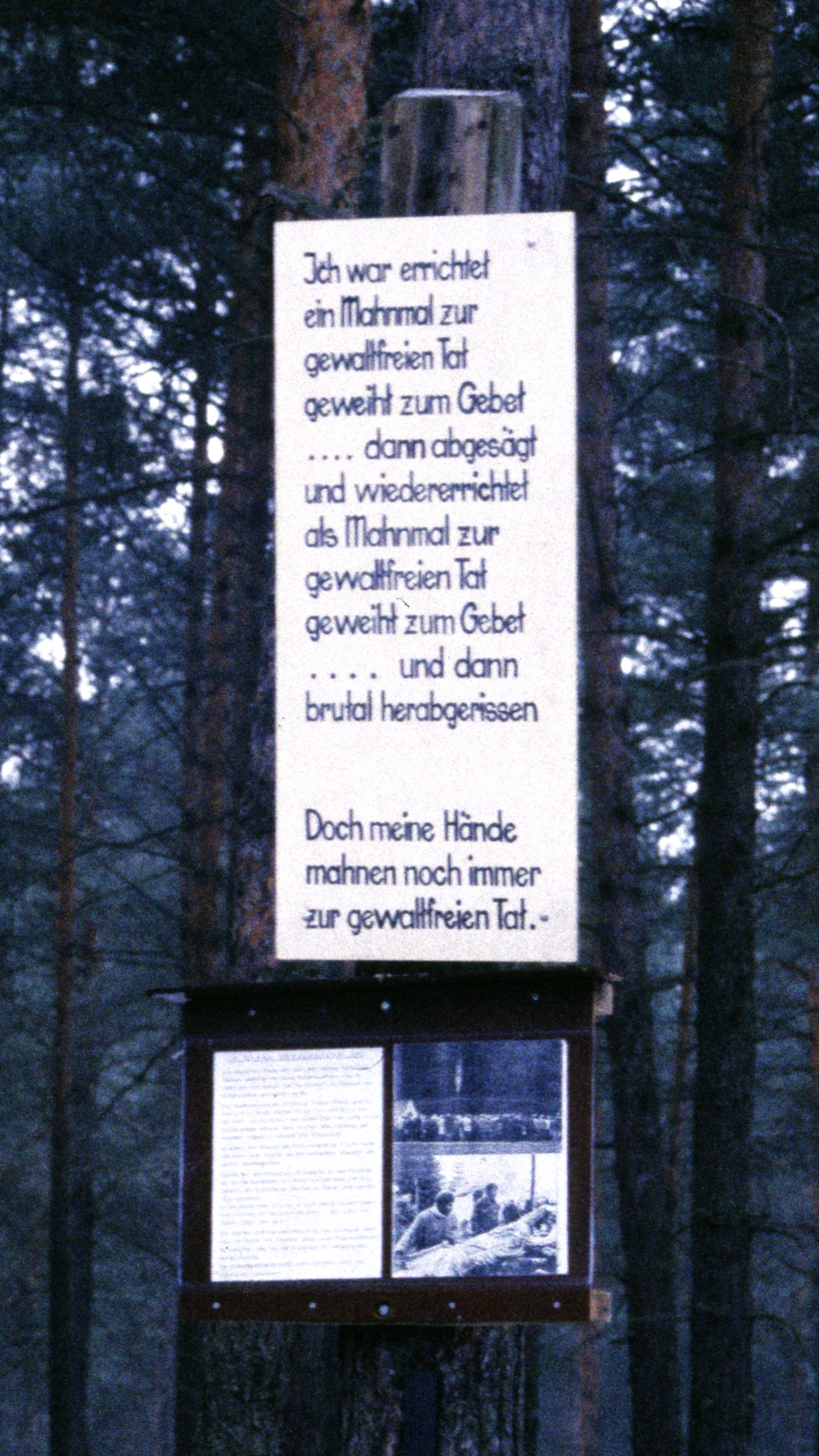
info

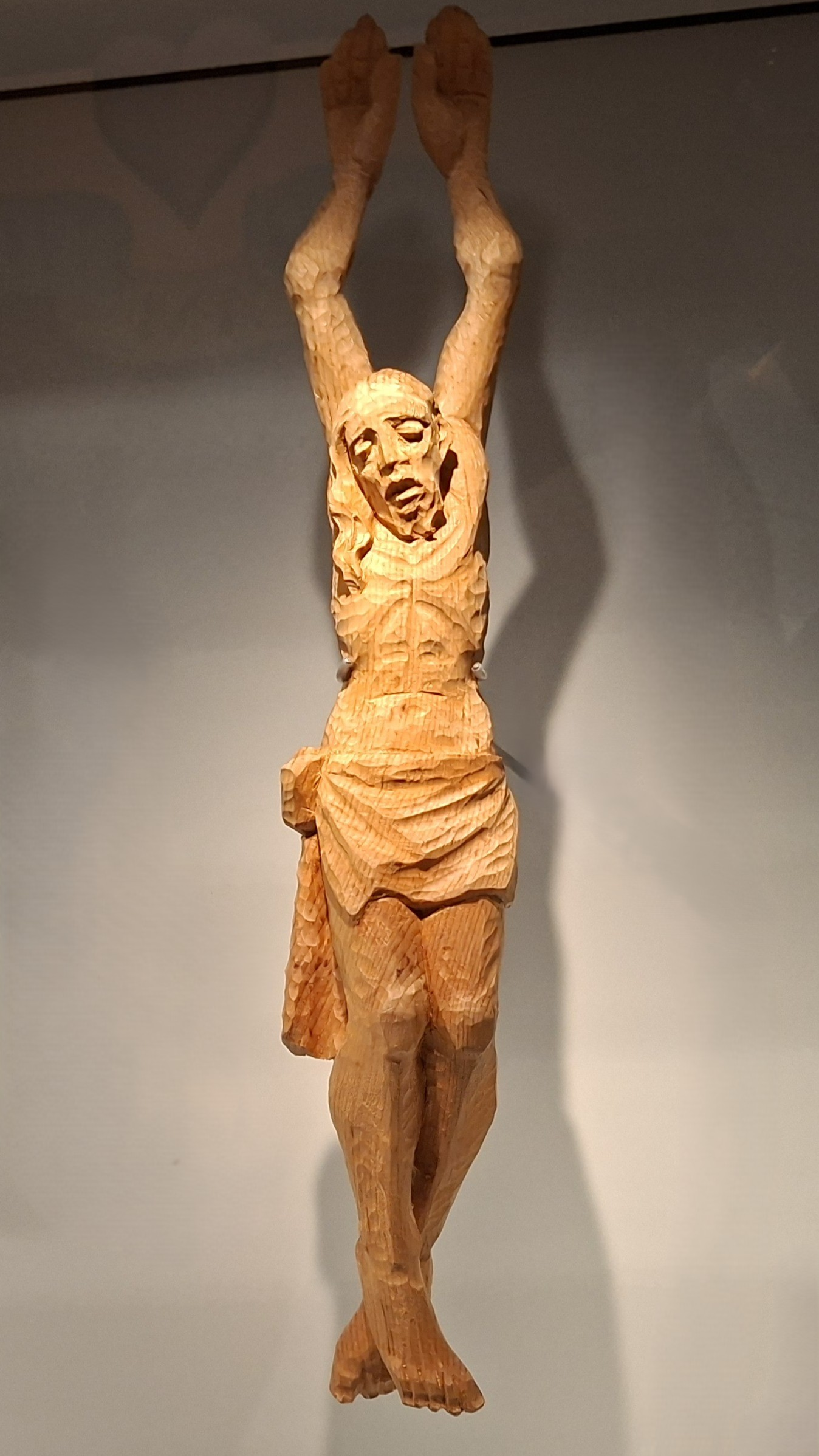
model

=== Nativity Scene ===
At Christmas 1985, approximately 1,500 citizens from near and far arrived to celebrate Christmas Eve in the tent village. The official Christmas service was conducted by two Catholic and three Protestant clergy members outside the tent village at the Red Cross site, without the knowledge of their church leadership. Riot police officers celebrated in their quarters on the outskirts of Wackersdorf. Christmas trees were decorated, and a nativity scene made of clay figures was set up beneath the "Keffiyeh Cross". The original nativity figures - Mary with the infant Jesus and Joseph (without a hat) - are on display at the House of Bavarian History in Regensburg.

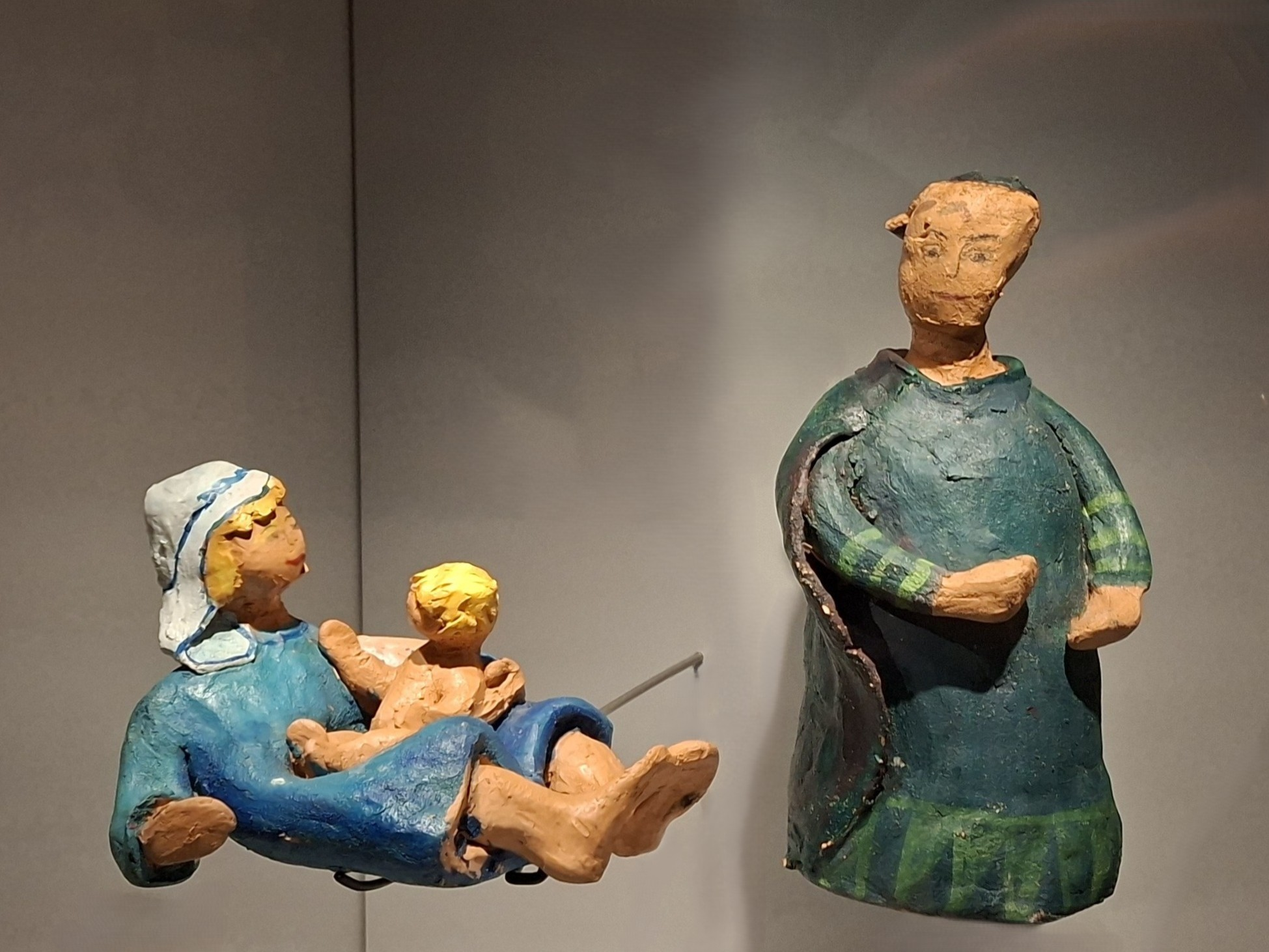
Mary - Jesus - Joseph

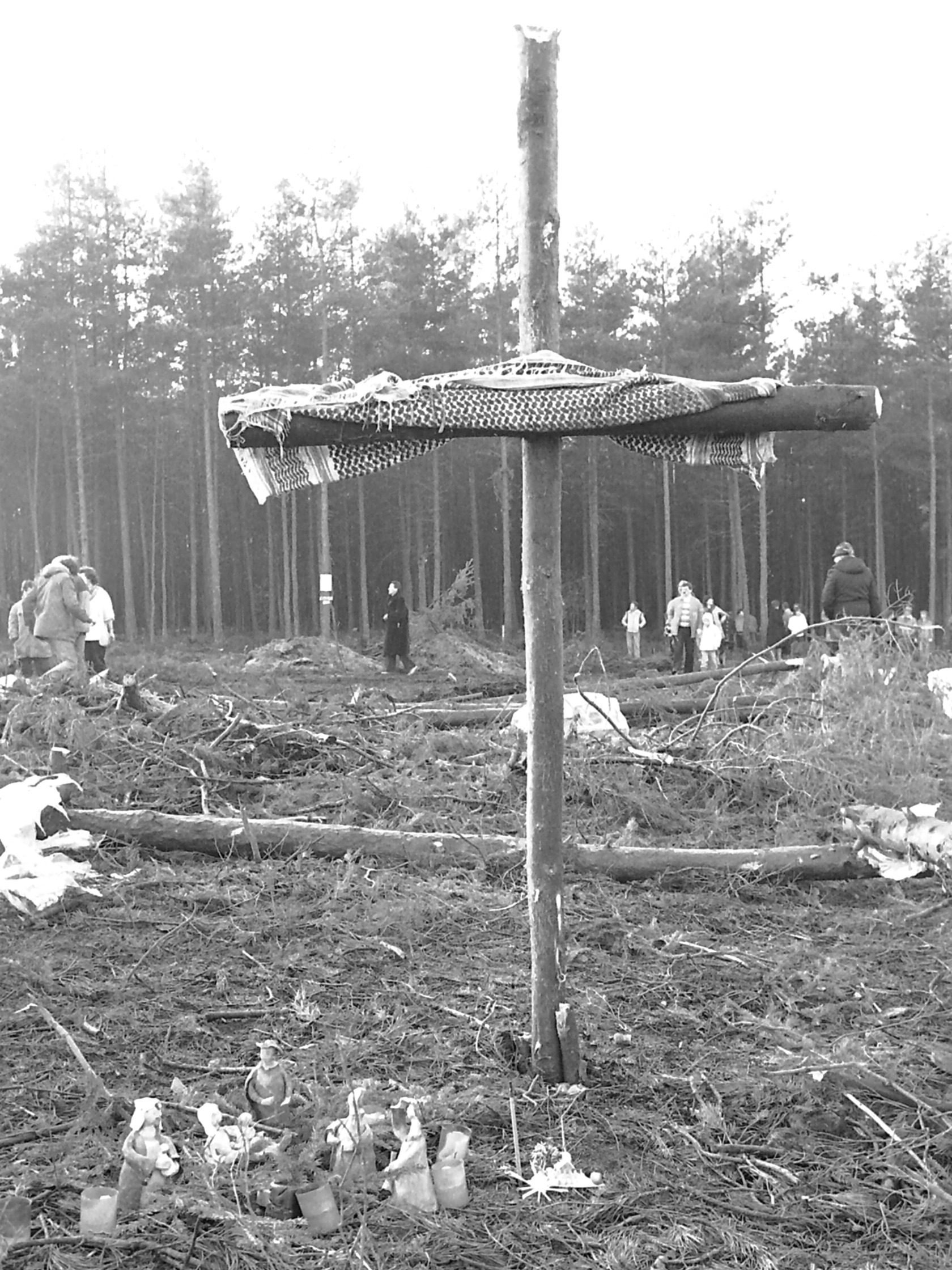
Nativity Scene

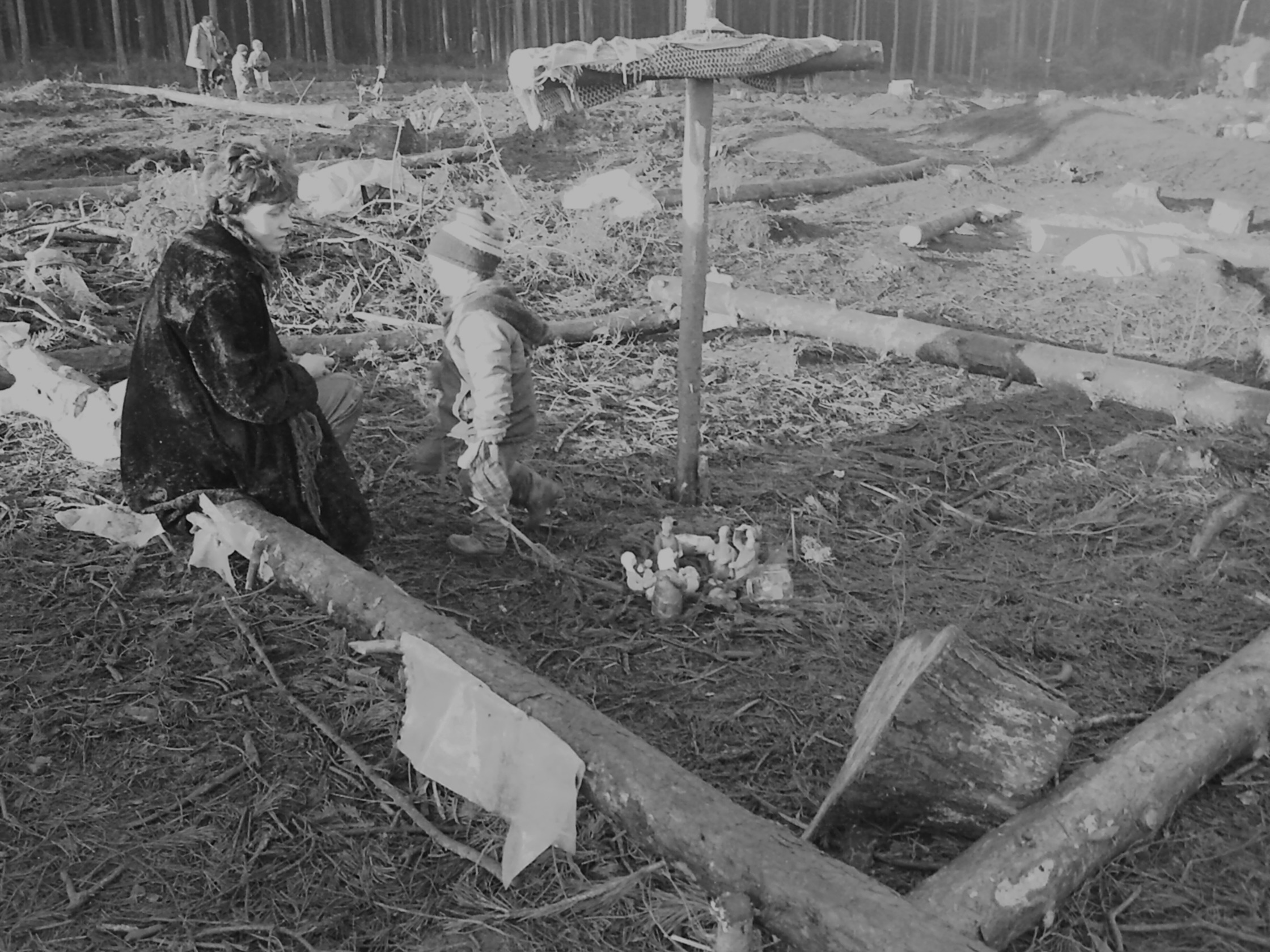
Kufiya-Cross / Nativity Scene

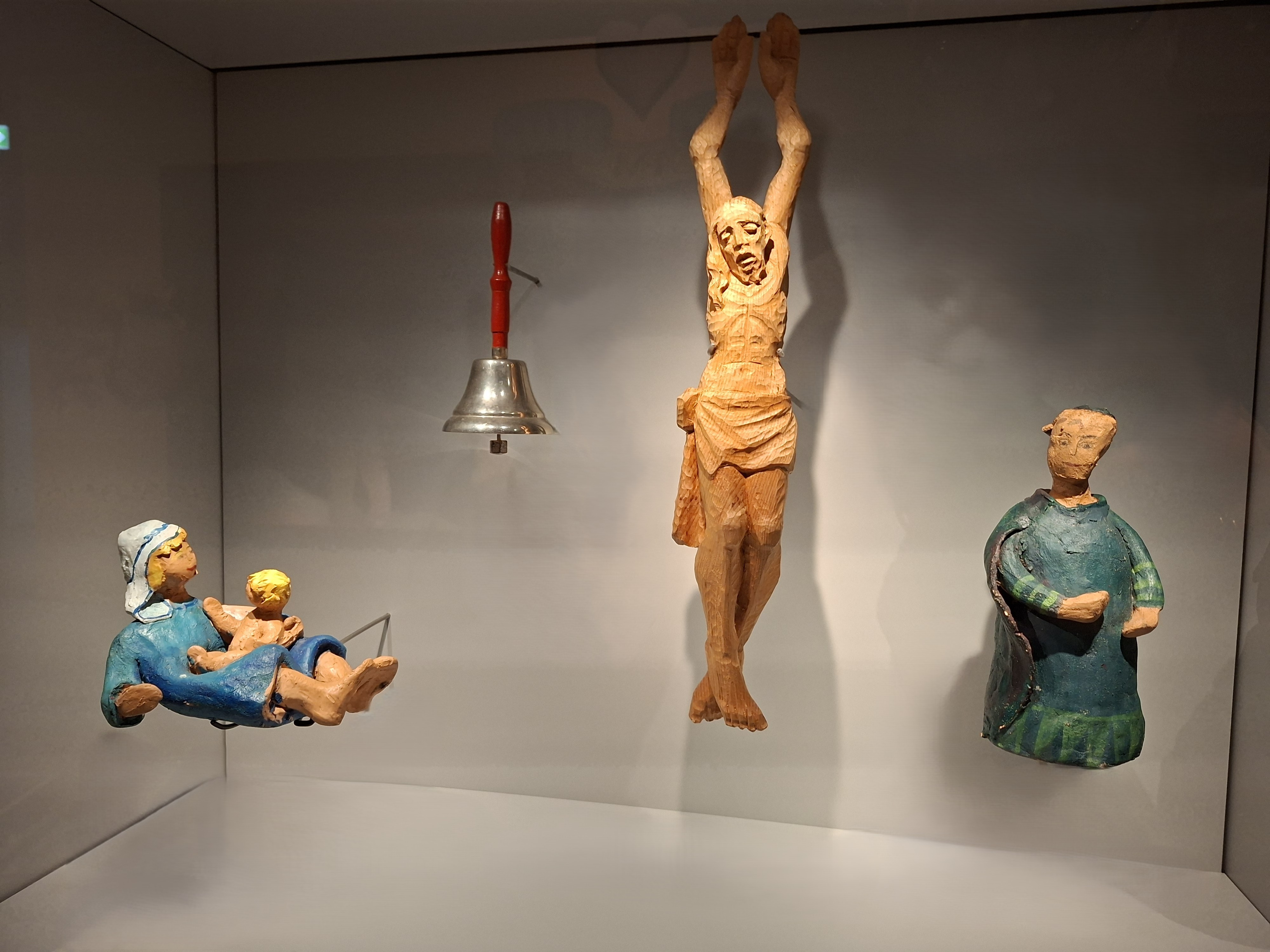
Exhibition (HdBG)

== Police Eviction ==
Following the Christmas truce, 2,000 police officers began clearing the shantytown early in the morning of January 7, 1986. During the eviction, which lasted into the night, over 1,000 people (mostly from out of town) were detained for identification purposes. Some treehouses were taken over from a helicopter, and special forces officers rappelled from the police helicopter onto the high treehouses. Batons and police dogs were used. Several WAA opponents were injured, some seriously, by the dogs. District Administrator Hans Schuierer, who was also nearly bitten by a dog, described the police action as "terror in its purest form" and faced disciplinary proceedings for it, among other things. On the day of the eviction, SPD state parliament member Christa Meier (MdL) drove to the hut village in the Taxölden Forest at 5:30 a.m. together with Otto Benner (MdL), Wolfgang Sieler (MdB), District Administrator Hans Schuierer and other residents of Schwandorf and described in the Bavarian State Parliament (Landtag of Bavaria) on February 20 how dramatically she had experienced the eviction of the hut village.

== Film and audio documents ==
- 1986: Wackersdorf – The Hut Village / Scenes from "The Police Go to Wackersdorf". Events from the start of the clearing to the clearing of the second hut village. Film by Victor Halb, 18 min
- 1986: 18 Days of Free Wackersdorf. Media Workshop Franconia, Library of Resistance Volume 19, 4 min
- 1986: 18 Days of Free Wackersdorf. Media Workshop Franconia, 13 min
- 1986: 18 Days of Free Wackersdorf. Media Workshop Franconia, 11 min
- 1986: Spaltprozesse (Division Processes) Documentary film 1986, Hut Village Construction, Hut Village Clearance, etc., 96 min
- 1986: WAA Wackersdorf: A Bright Future for the Upper Palatinate. Monitor report, 15 min
- 1986: Wackersdorf – A Myth. Medienwerkstatt Franken, 24 min
- 1986: Konstantin Wecker: The Tree (WAA protest song about forest clearing, eviction of the shantytown, ...), 5 min
- 1986: Biermösl Blosn: It Must Have Been a Sunday (WAA protest song), from min 2
- 2006: The WAA Specter – Resistance in Wackersdorf. Medienwerkstatt Franken, Library of Resistance Volume 19, 25 min
- 2012: Better Active Today Than Radioactive Tomorrow / The Nuclear Power Plant Protest Movement: From Wyhl to Wackersdorf, ttt, 6 min
- 2017: Nuclear Dispute in Wackersdorf – The Story of an Escalation. ARD/BR, Documentary, 44 min
- 2018: Uprising in Wackerland: Radio Story on Radio Z, 36 min
