= Franziskus-Marterl =

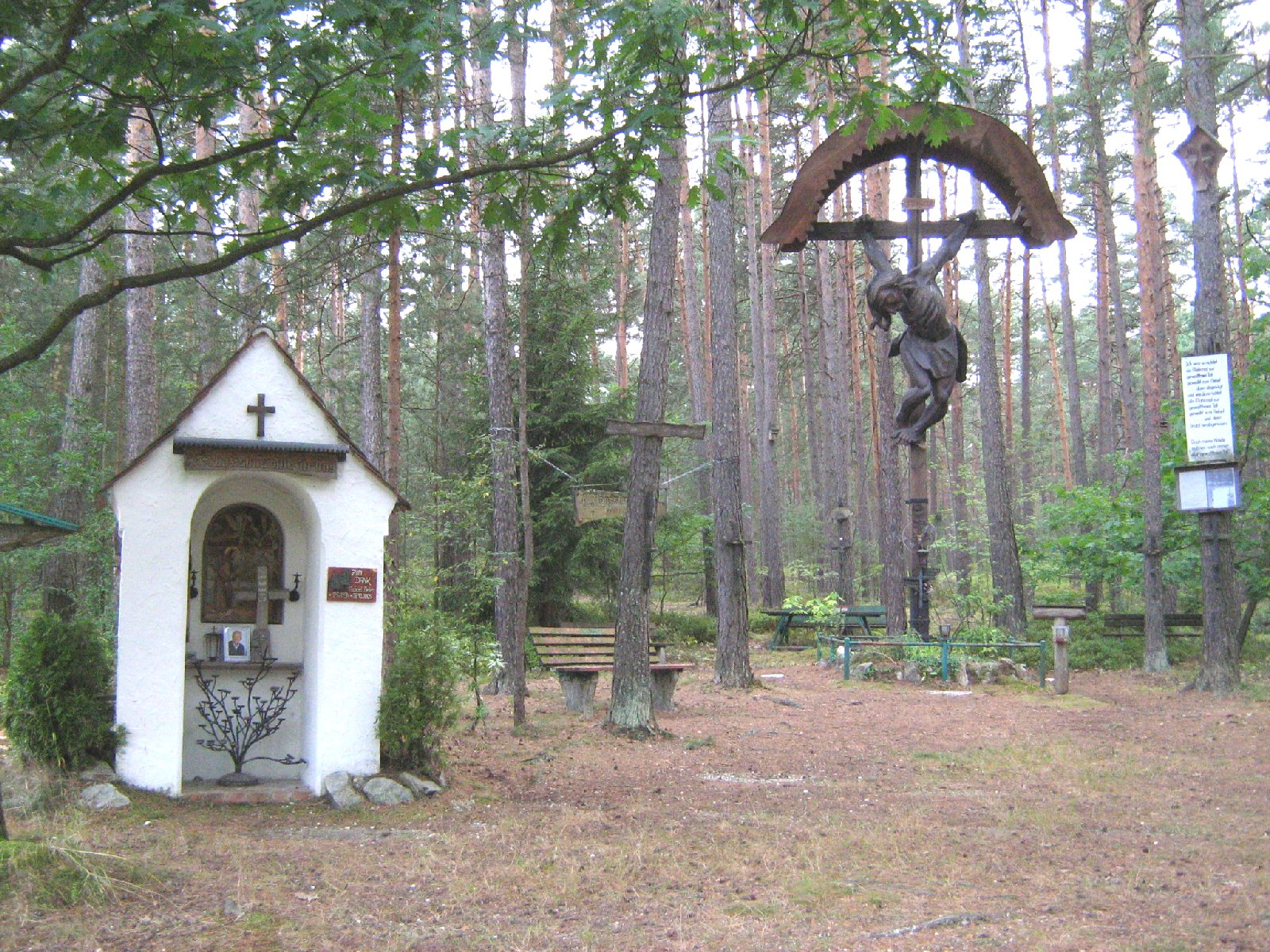
- St. Francis Chapel / Cross of Wackersdorf
- Location: Bavaria, Germany
- Coordinates: 49°18′47.4″N 12°14′40.6″E
- Designer: Berndt Trepesch, ...
- Type: WAA-Protest-Memorials
- Opening date: 1984

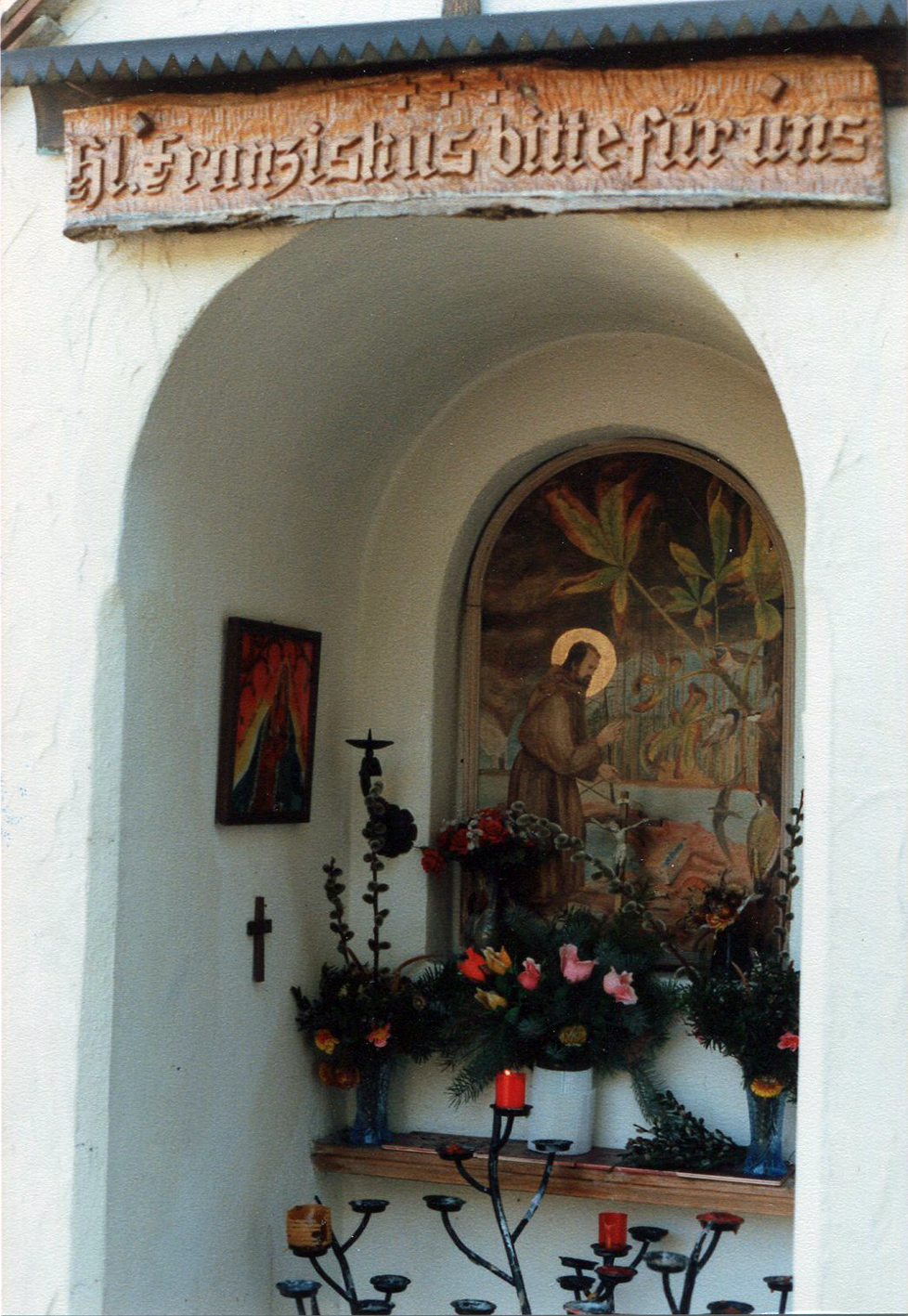
St. Francis is preaching to the birds

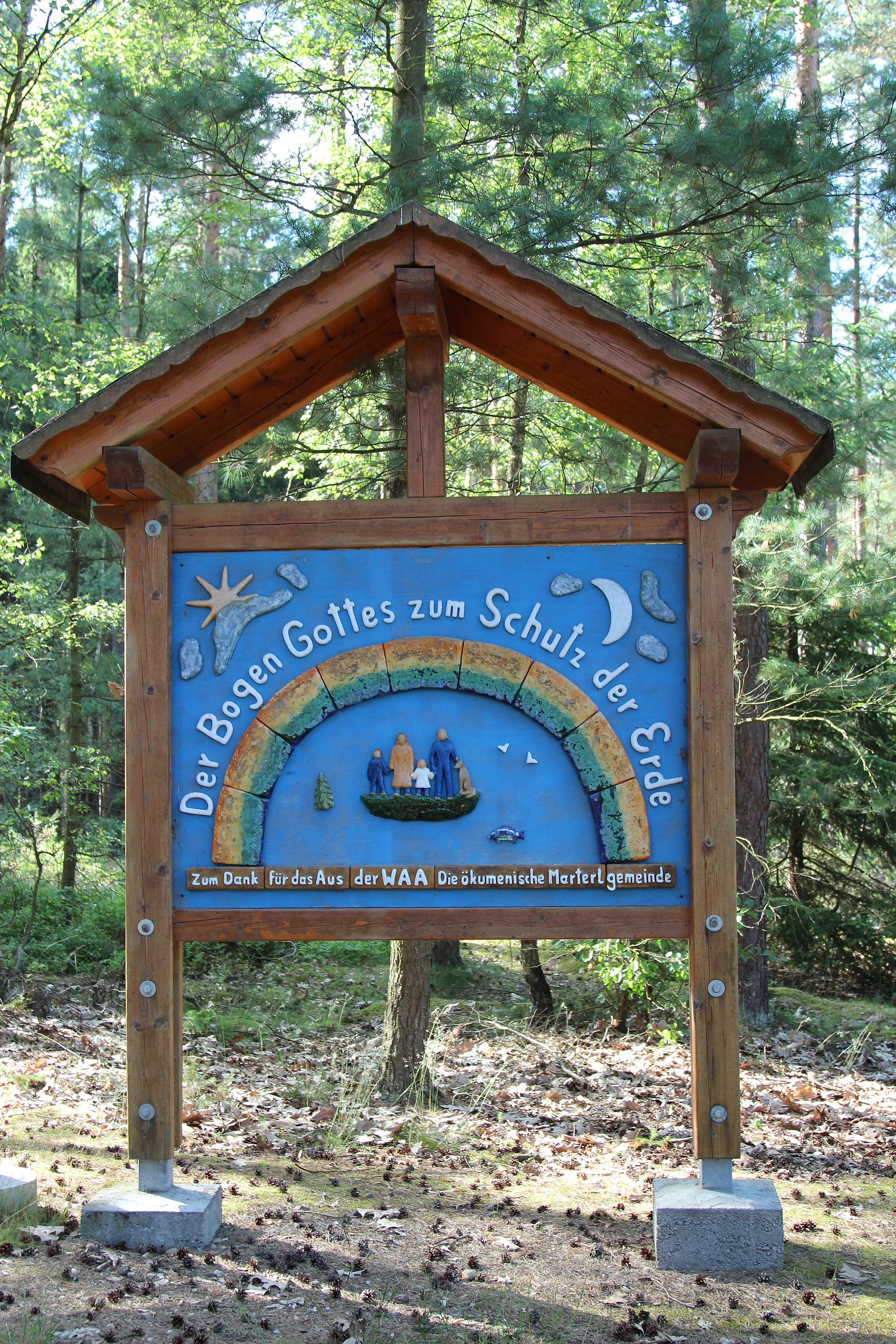
Thanks for end of WAA - "The bow of God to protect the earth"

The Franziskus-Marterl is a chapel-shrine in the southeast of the unfinished Wackersdorf reprocessing plant (WAA) "Im Blaubeerwald" in Altenschwand (Bodenwöhr, Schwandorf (district), Bavaria). The WAA resistance marterl is dedicated to Francis of Assisi and is surrounded by several other protest monuments. The "Franziskus-Marterl" is a stone reminder of the fight against the reprocessing plant.

== History ==
The chapel was built in 1984 on Michael Meier's property. A building permit was not required for the small structure. On September 30, 1984, the wayside shrine chapel was consecrated by Catholic priest Richard Salzl together with Protestant pastor Matthias Kietz.

At the shrine in the mid-1980s, WAA opponents met every Sunday at 14:00 for an ecumenical prayer and then moved into the area or to the hoarding. This is the same place where today the "Marterlgemeinde" meet four times a year to a prayer: at the Chernobyl disaster and Atomic bombings of Hiroshima and Nagasaki in memory of the shrine's saint Francis of Assisi on 3 October and on Christmas Eve.

In 2024, the Franziskus-Marterl was digitized by the Upper Palatinate Open-Air Museum using a 3D scanner to preserve its history for future generations.

== Monument ensemble ==
The Franziskus-Marterl includes several monuments:

- St. Francis Chapel from 1984 with the painting Environmental Protection Sermon to the Birds by Berndt Trepesch
- Wailing Wall of the Franziskus-Marterl
- Stolen Cross of Wackersdorf, 1985; Stefan Preisl
- Cross of Wackersdorf 1986; artist Stefan Preisl (Burglengenfeld)
- The torn Man (Der zerrissene Mensch); 1987, artist Michael Graßl (Ingolstadt)
- Wackersdorf - Gorleben cross: Stations of the Cross Memorial Cross Wackersdorf-Gorleben 1988
- God's bow to protect the earth 1989; artist Valerie Schwandner (Schwarzenfeld)
- Resistance trees at the Franziskus-Marterl
- "WAA-NO" mosaic heart; artist Richard Salzl
- Austrians' Bench
- some more protest wooden signs

== Films, podcasts, and eyewitness accounts ==
- 1996: Wackersdorf – Ein Mythos (Wackersdorf – a myth?) What became of the WAA fighters of yesteryear?
- 2006: Schreckgespenst WAA – Widerstand in Wackersdorf (The WAA Reprocessing Plant Swarm Response – Resistance in Wackersdorf)
- 2014: Andreas Schlagenhaufer (Catholic priest) reports on the Sunday walks as a form of protest against the WAA in Wackersdorf and the associated clashes with the police.
- 2015: Stolen Cross of Wackersdorf: Stefan Preisl (wood sculptor) reports on the erection of the wooden cross with the Christ figure he carved in the Wackersdorf hut village and its removal by the police during the eviction.
- 2015: Cross of Wackersdorf: Stefan Preisl reports on the creation and erection of the second wooden Christ figure, which can still be seen at the wayside cross in Wackersdorf today.
- 2015: Claus Bößenecker (legal officer) reports on the erection of the wayside cross near the construction fence and the importance of religion in the resistance against the WAA Wackersdorf.
- 2018: Book presentation at the Franziskus-Marterl, TVA, 2 min
- 2018: Students in the 12th grade and their teacher, Leonhard Riedmeier, from the Oskar-von-Miller Vocational School Center in Schwandorf, Neunburg vorm Wald branch, restored the Franziskus-Marterl and other objects in its vicinity.
- 2024: Franziskus-Marterl digital
- 2024: Franziskus-Marterl in Wackersdorf: Christian Resistance against Nuclear Power with Leo Feichtmeier, Hans Schuierer, Andreas Schlagenhaufer, Wolfgang Nowak (activist)
- 2026: Interview with Wolfgang Nowak
- 2026: 40 years ago: Environmental protests in Wackersdorf - The role of churches in the Wackersdorf protests
- 2026: 40 years after the Easter Monday demonstration: Hans Schuierer at the Franziskus-Marterl from BUND Naturschutz honored

== Franziskus-Marterl Medal ==
Franziskus-Marterl Medal 2026 at the God's Bow for the Protection of the Earth

On October 3, 2026, the Franziskus-Marterl Medal awarded for environmental protection and civil courage was presented for the first time at the Franziskus-Marterl. The recipients were the priests Andreas Schlagenhaufer, Leo Feichtmeier (posthumously), and Richard Salzl (posthumously) who were involved in the protests against the nuclear Wackersdorf reprocessing plant as well as environmental activist and shrine caretaker Wolfgang Nowak.

== See also ==
- List of memorials related to the Wackersdorf reprocessing plant
