= Michael Meier (environmentalist) =

- "For posterity to remember" Michael Meier on his property in 1986
- Born: June 12, 1934; Altenschwand (Bavaria, Germany)
- Died: October 26, 2005 (aged 71)
- Occupations: Farmer; Environmentalist

Michael Meier (June 12, 1934 – October 26, 2005) was a farmer and an opponent of the Wackersdorf reprocessing plant (WAA) in Bavaria.

== Personal life and work ==
Michael Meier was born in 1934, one of eleven children. For 27 years, he worked for the Bavarian brown coal industry in Wackersdorf until it ceased operations in 1982. Afterwards, the part-time farmer worked as a laborer on construction sites or in subsidized employment programs, and at times was unemployed and lived on unemployment benefits. His wife died in 1986.

== Opponents of the Wackersdorf reprocessing plant ==
Michael Meier refused to sell his land to the Wackersdorf reprocessing plant developers. He was the only one of eight property owners adjacent to the construction site who filed a legal challenge in 1985. He and his lawyer, Wolfgang Baumann, demanded an immediate halt to construction. In 1988, Meier prevailed in this legal challenge before the Bavarian Administrative Court, and the development plan for the WAA was declared invalid. However, construction of the plant continued based on individual building permits.

"Michael Meier was a symbolic figure of the WAA resistance. While a handful of landowners sold their properties to the WAA operating company DWK for large sums of money, Michael Meier remained steadfast. He - the smallest and poorest - persevered, remained steadfast, and was not tempted by money."

== Franziskus-Marterl ==
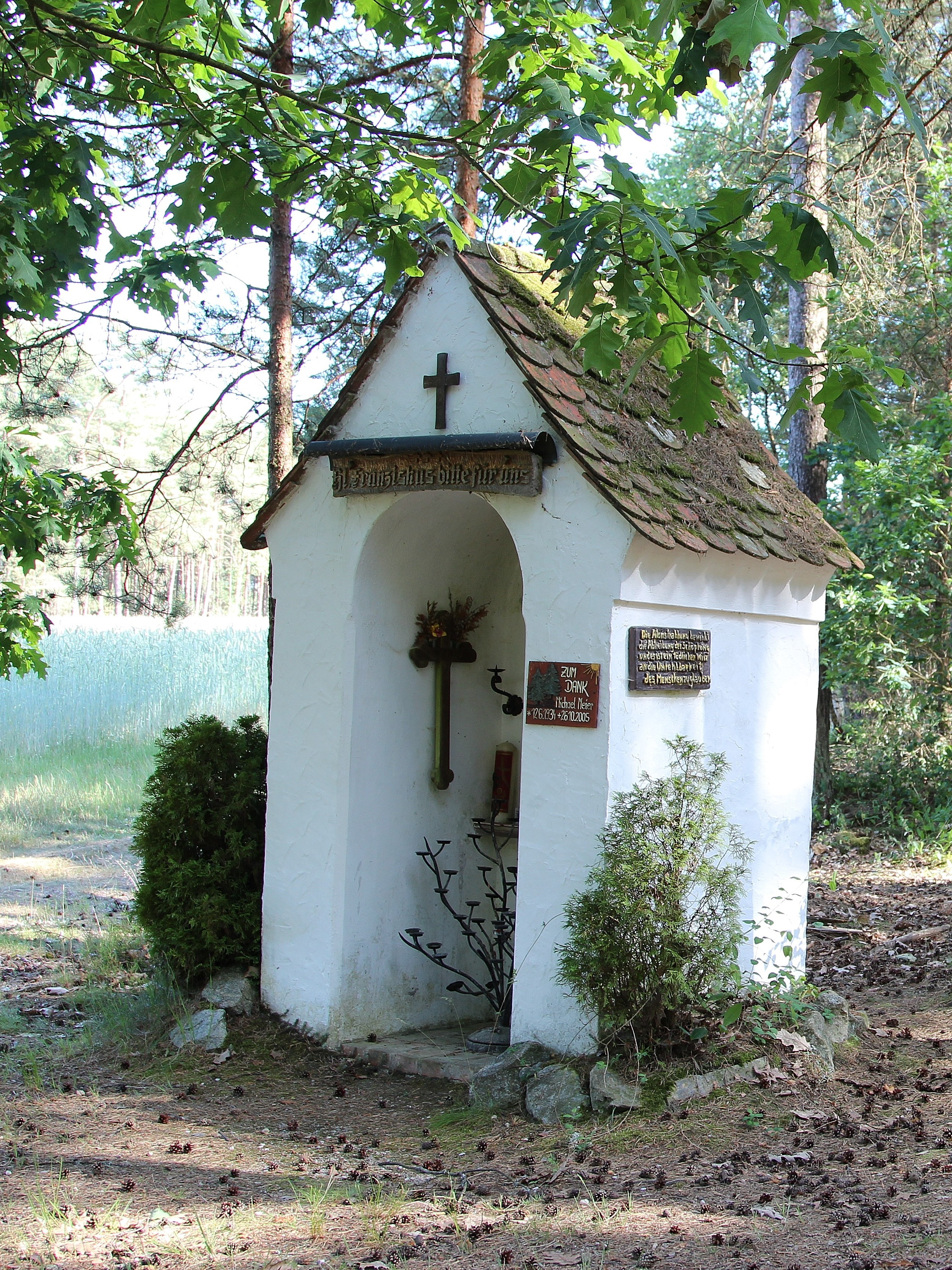
Franziskus-Marterl on the property of Michael Meier

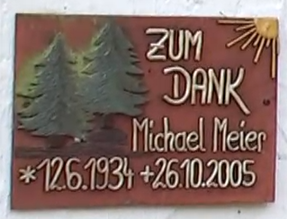
Thanks to Michael Meier at the Franziskus-Marterl chapel

The Franziskus-Marterl (St. Francis wayside shrine) was erected in 1984 on land donated by Meier.[5] At that time, Meier sold the shrine grounds to the Bund Naturschutz (Association for the Protection of Nature), thus creating the conditions for the religious meeting place and regular devotions. Today, a photograph of Meier and a memorial plaque reading "In gratitude - Michael Meier - *June 12, 1934 †October 26, 2005" can be seen at the shrine. Meier also made his land available for two other protest monuments. - (see: List of WAA memorials)

== Documentaries ==
- 1995: Meier / Mayer / Mittermeier - Three farmers against concrete - Meier stopped the WAA construction, Mayer couldn't stop the canal construction, Mittermeier wants to prevent the Danube expansion, (RB/ARD, 45-minute feature from the series: Under German Roofs, Helge Cramer Filmproduktion)
- 1996: Wackersdorf - Ein Mythos, Medienwerkstatt Franken, 24 min
- 2006: Schreckgespenst WAA (Widerstand in Wackersdorf), Medienwerkstatt Franken, 25 min
