= Wilhelm Kempff =

German pianist (1895–1991)

Album cover for Wilhelm Kempff's recording of Beethoven Piano Sonatas on DG 139 935 (1965), which received the Grand Prix du Disque

Wilhelm Walter Friedrich Kempff (25 November 1895 – 23 May 1991) was a German pianist, teacher and composer. Although his repertoire included Bach, Mozart, Chopin, Schumann, Liszt and Brahms, Kempff was particularly well known for his interpretations of the music of Ludwig van Beethoven and Franz Schubert, recording the complete sonatas of both composers. He is considered to have been one of the chief exponents of the Germanic tradition during the 20th century.

== Early life ==
Kempff was born in Jüterbog, Brandenburg, in 1895. He grew up in nearby Potsdam where his father was a royal music director and organist at St. Nicolai Church. His grandfather was also an organist and his brother Georg became director of church music at the University of Erlangen. Kempff studied music at first at the Berlin Hochschule für Musik at the age of nine after receiving lessons from his father at a younger age. Whilst there he studied composition with Robert Kahn and piano with Karl Heinrich Barth (with whom Arthur Rubinstein also studied). In 1914 Kempff moved on to study at the Viktoria gymnasium in Potsdam before returning to Berlin to finish his training.

== As a pianist ==
In 1917, Kempff gave his first major recital, consisting of predominantly major works, including Beethoven's Hammerklavier Sonata and Brahms Variations on a Theme of Paganini. Kempff toured widely in Europe and much of the rest of the world. Between 1936 and 1979 he performed ten times in Japan (a small Japanese island was named Kenpu-san in his honor). Kempff made his first London appearance in 1951 and his first in New York in 1964. He gave his last public performance in Paris in 1981, and then retired for health reasons (Parkinson's disease). He died in Positano, Italy, in 1991 at the age of 95, five years after his wife, whom he had married in 1926.

Kempff recorded over 60 years. His recorded legacy includes works of Schumann, Brahms, Schubert, Mozart, Bach, Liszt, Chopin and particularly of Beethoven.

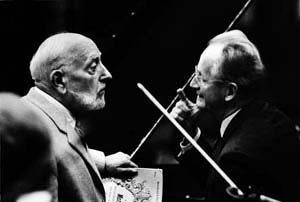
Kempff (right) with Ernest Ansermet (left) in 1965

He recorded the complete sonatas of Franz Schubert long before these works became popular, albeit restricting himself to the finished movements, not fragments, in sonatas that Schubert left incomplete. He also recorded two sets of the complete Beethoven sonatas, one in mono (1951–1956) and the other in stereo (1964–1965); earlier, he recorded nearly all on shellac (1926–1945). He recorded the complete Beethoven piano concertos twice as well, both with the Berlin Philharmonic; the first from the early 1950s in mono with Paul van Kempen, and the later in stereo from the early 1960s with Ferdinand Leitner. Kempff also recorded chamber music with Yehudi Menuhin, Pierre Fournier, Wolfgang Schneiderhan, Paul Grümmer, and Henryk Szeryng, among others.

He left recordings of most of his repertory, including the complete sonatas of Beethoven and Schubert. He performed to an advanced age, continuing to give concerts past his 80th birthday. His association with the Berlin Philharmonic spanned over 60 years.

=== Service to the Nazi regime ===
During the Nazi rule, Kempff supported it by going on propaganda tours and performing in the countries under Nazi occupation.

=== Technique and style ===
External audio
- You may hear Wilhelm Kempff performing Ludwig van Beethoven's Piano Concerto No. 4 in G major, Op. 58 with Ferdinand Leitner conducting the Berlin Philharmonic in 1962 Here on archive.org

As a performer Kempff stressed lyricism and spontaneity in music, particularly effective in intimate pieces or passages. He always strove for a singing, lyrical quality. He avoided extreme tempos and display for its own sake.

In his book The Veil of Order, the pianist Alfred Brendel wrote that Kempff "played on impulse... it depended on whether the right breeze, as with an aeolian harp, was blowing. You then would take something home that you never heard elsewhere." He regards Kempff as the "most rhythmical" of his colleagues. Brendel helped choose the selections for the Philips label's Great Pianists of the 20th Century issue of Kempff recordings, and wrote in the notes that Kempff "achieves things that are beyond him" in his "unsurpassable" recording of Liszt's first Legende, "St. Francis Preaching to the Birds."

When pianist Artur Schnabel undertook his pioneering complete recording of the Beethoven sonatas in the 1930s, he told EMI that if he didn't complete the cycle, they should have Kempff complete the remainder. Later, when Kempff was in Finland, the composer Jean Sibelius asked him to play the slow movement of Beethoven's 29th Sonata, the Hammerklavier; after Kempff finished, Sibelius told him, "You did not play that as a pianist but rather as a human being."

== As a teacher ==
From 1924 to 1929, Kempff took over the direction of the Stuttgart College of Music as a successor of Max Pauer. In 1931, he was co-founder of the summer courses at Marmorpalais Potsdam. In 1957, Kempff founded Fondazione Orfeo (today: Kempff Kulturstiftung) in the south-Italian city Positano and held his first Beethoven interpretation masterclass at Casa Orfeo, which Kempff had built especially for this reason. He continued teaching there once a year until 1982. His wife died in 1986.

Other noted pianists to have studied with Kempff include Jörg Demus, Norman Shetler, Mitsuko Uchida, Maria João Pires, Peter Schmalfuss, İdil Biret and Ventsislav Yankov.

== As a composer ==
A lesser-known activity of Kempff was composing. He composed for almost every genre and used his own cadenzas for Beethoven's Piano Concertos 1–4. His student İdil Biret has recorded a CD of his piano works. His second symphony premiered in 1929 at the Leipzig Gewandhaus by Wilhelm Furtwängler. He also prepared a number of Bach transcriptions, including the Siciliano from the Flute Sonata in E-flat major, that have been recorded by Kempff and others. His opera Famile Gozzi, a comic work in three acts, was written in 1934.

== Autobiography ==
- Kempff, Wilhelm. Unter dem Zimbelstern: Jugenderinnerungen eines Pianisten ["Under the Cymbal Star: The Development of a Musician" (1951)]. Laaber: Laaber Verlag, 1978.

== Recordings ==
Among many others:

- Beethoven: Piano Sonata No. 22 / Schubert: Piano Sonata D 845, op. 42 & works by Rameau, François Couperin, Handel and W. A. Mozart (SWR Music / Hänssler Classic) CD 93.720; released in 2013
- Beethoven: Piano Sonatas Nos. 1, 12, 19, and 20 (DG LP 138 935; released 1965; recipient of Grand Prix du Disque)
- Schubert: The Piano Sonatas (complete), (DG 463 766-2 (seven compact disks)) recordings made from February, 1965 - January, 1969.
