= Saint Francis Preaching to the Birds =

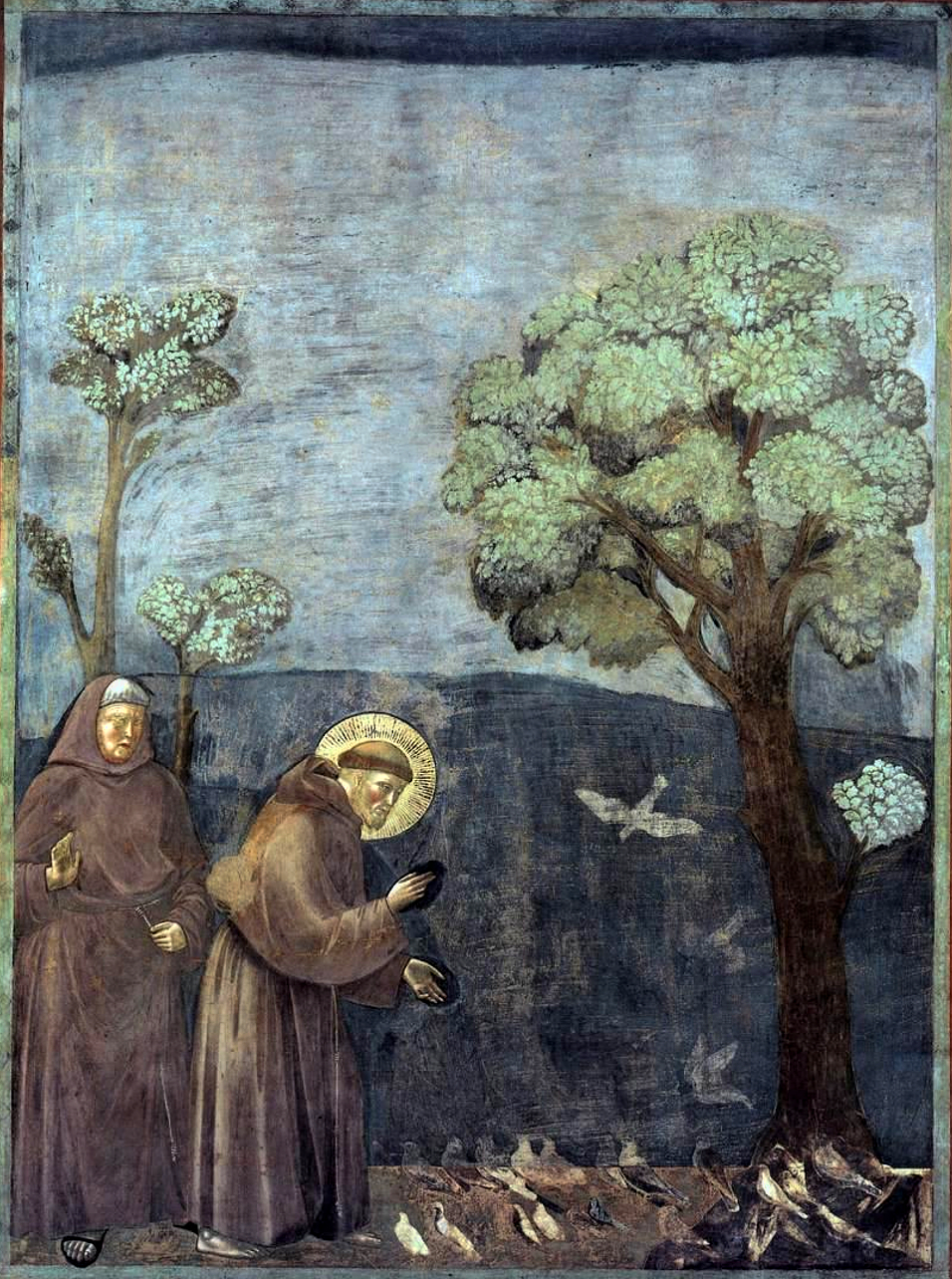
Fresco: Basilica of Saint Francis of Assisi from Giotto di Bondone 1295

The Saint Francis Preaching to the Birds or Sermon to the Birds is a famous legend about Saint Francis of Assisi (c. 1182–1226). Francis believed that nature itself was the mirror of God. In the Canticle of the Sun he called all creatures his "brothers" and "sisters"; he even preached to the birds.

== Legend ==
Many of the stories that surround the life of Francis say that he had a great love for animals and the environment. The Fioretti ("Little Flowers") is a collection of legends and folklore that sprang up after Francis' death. One account describes how one day, while Francis was travelling with some companions, they happened upon a place in the road where birds filled the trees on either side. Francis told his companions to "wait for me while I go to preach to my sisters the birds." The birds surrounded him, intrigued by the power of his voice and not one of them flew away. He is often portrayed with a bird, typically in his hand.

== Legendtext about 1220 ==
My little sisters, the birds, much bounden are ye unto God, your Creator, and always in every place ought ye to praise Him, for that He hath given you liberty to fly about everywhere, and hath also given you double and triple raiment; moreover He preserved your seed in the ark of Noah, that your race might not perish out of the world; still more are ye beholden to Him for the element of the air which He hath appointed for you; beyond all this, ye sow not, neither do you reap; and God feedeth you, and giveth you the streams and fountains for your drink; the mountains and valleys for your refuge and the high trees whereon to make your nests; and because ye know not how to spin or sow, God clotheth you, you and your children; wherefore your Creator loveth you much, seeing that He hath bestowed on you so many benefits; and therefore, my little sisters, beware of the sin of ingratitude, and study always to give praises unto God.

== Artistic representations ==
Contemporary interpretation of the legend in the Franziskus-Marterl (Bavaria) against environmental destruction and WAA: sermon in front of dead birds - Berndt Trepesch 1984

The theme of the Sermon to the Birds has been interpreted in a variety of ways in the art world. In 1982, the year of the 800th anniversary of Francis of Assisi, it was the occasion for a postmark issued by the Deutsche Bundespost. Franz Liszt set it to music in his Deux Légendes St François d’Assise „La prédication aux oiseaux“ (The Sermon to the Birds).

In the first Roman The Name of the Rose, the Italian legend by Umberto Eco, the hero William of Baskerville is depicted, representing Francis's compassion for the poorest and most marginalized. The sermon was not addressed to songbirds, but rather to corvids and other scavengers in the cemetery.

Saint François d'Assise, is an opera in three acts and eight scenes by French composer Olivier Messiaen. It concerns Saint Francis of Assisi, the titular character, and displays Messiaen's devout Catholicism.

== See also ==
- Saint Anthony Preaching to the Fish
- Predica agli uccelli (Giotto-fresco: Sermon to the Birds)
