= Berndt Trepesch =

German artist and teacher

- Trepesch 1986
- Born: February 1952 (age 74); Amberg (Bavaria, Germany)
- Occupations: Artist, Teacher

Berndt Trepesch (born February 1952, in Amberg) is a German artist and teacher.

== Life ==
Trepesch graduated from the Gregor-Mendel-Gymnasium in Amberg in 1972 and studied at the Academy of Fine Arts Nuremberg from 1972 to 1973. After completing his civilian service, he continued his studies and passed his first state examination in 1979. Following his teaching traineeship, he passed his second state examination in 1981. Trepesch then taught at the Herzog-Christian-August-Gymnasium in Sulzbach-Rosenberg. In 1979, he joined the "Gruppe Amberger Künstler" (GAK). In 1984, he purchased and renovated the Weiglhof in Speckmannshof. Trepesch's uncle was the landscape and portrait painter Josef Vietze (1902–1988).

== Works (selection) ==
Trepesch's works encompass a wide variety of paintings, prints, sculptures, and installations.

=== Art against the Wackersdorf reprocessing plant ===
Anti-WAA votive offering (1984)

Environmental protection Sermon to the Birds (1984)

Trepesch also engaged artistically in the opposition to the construction of the nuclear Wackersdorf reprocessing plant (WAA). He painted the anti-WAA votive tablet, which was carried to the Church of Our Lady of Kreuzberg in Schwandorf during a penitential procession in 1984 and hung in the Chapel of Grace there. The votive tablet depicts the flash of light from an atomic bomb, with the Madonna of Mercy visible in front of the atomic symbol on the radioactive cloud. The city of Schwandorf with the Kreuzberg hill and the Kreuzberg Church can also be seen, viewed from the direction of Amberg.

Also in 1984, Trepesch created the image for the Franziskus-Marterl (St. Francis wayside shrine) in the Taxölden Forest, which became a Sunday meeting place for many WAA opponents. He painted Francis of Assisi preaching to the Birds (Sermon to the Birds). A bluethroat, a nuthatch, and a green woodpecker can be seen in the chestnut tree. A common swift flies around. On the ground are a wagtail, a kingfisher, and two dead birds. Trash and an empty canister lie on the ground. In the background are a lake, transmission towers, and the Schwandorf coal-fired power plant, from which dirty brown clouds of smoke rise. Trepesch painted another anti-WAA votive panel for the Maria Hilf pilgrimage church in Amberg.

=== A Boat – or Letting Hope Sail ===
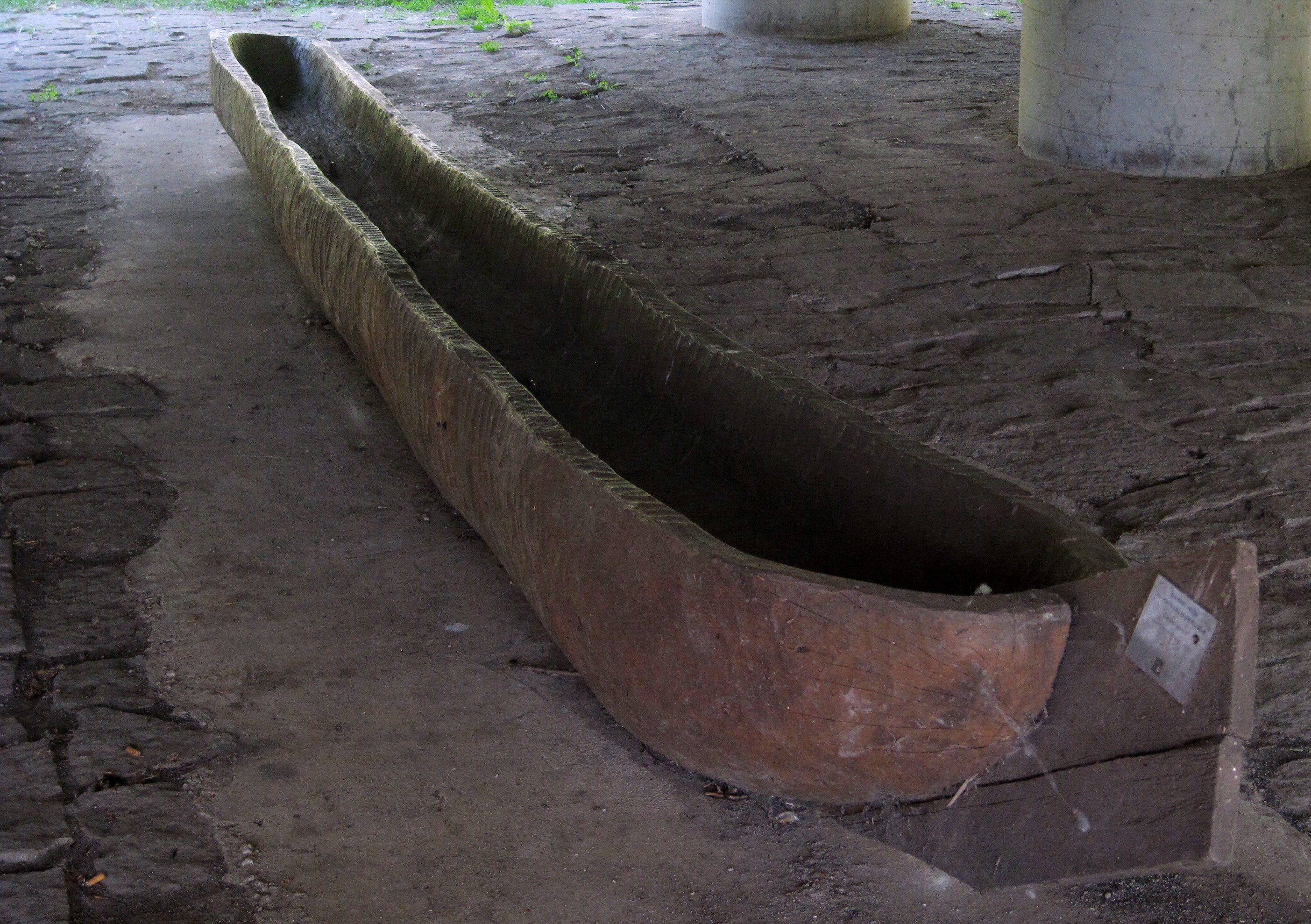
A Boat - or Letting Hope Sail (2010)

For the 2010 Amberg Sculpture Trail, Trepesch carved Ein Boot – oder die Hoffnung fahren lassen (A Boat – or Letting Hope Sail) from poplar wood. It is intended to be a symbol of life, as in the Romantic era (see Caspar David Friedrich).

== Exhibitions (selection) ==
To this day, Trepesch participates in almost all annual exhibitions of the "Amberg Artists' Group" (GAK). Other important exhibitions for him included those in Wiesenfelden organized by the Bund Naturschutz (Association for the Protection of Nature), at the open-air museum in Perschen, at the Upper Palatinate Artists' House in Fronberg, and in 2011 at the Museum Quarter in Tirschenreuth.

== Literature ==
- Hohl, Hüttner, Trepesch: Malerei, Grafik, Plastik, Installationen (Painting, Graphics, Sculpture, Installations), Oberpfälzer Künstlerhaus 1999, Schwandorf 1999
- Berndt Trepesch: Malerei, Plastik, Installationen (Painting, Sculpture, Installations), Villa Kebbel, Schwandorf 21.3.–29.4.1999
- Friedrich Brandl: Der Künstler Berndt Trepesch (The artist Berndt Trepesch), in: Lichtung 12, 1999 Nr. 3, p. 22–25
