= Deux Légendes =

Two pieces for piano solo by Franz Liszt

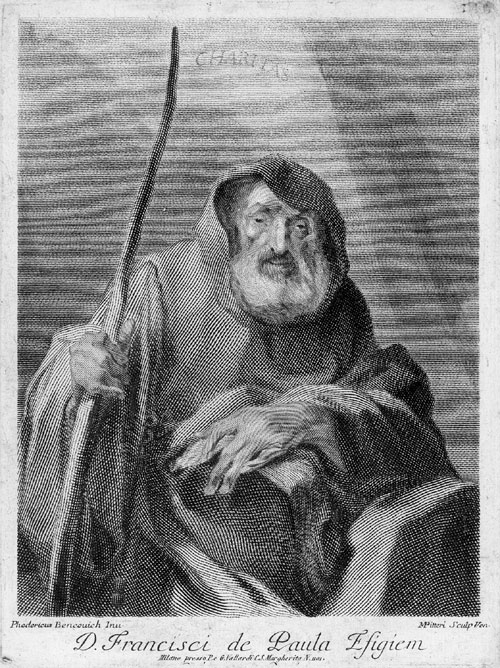
Saint Francis of Paola, in an engraving by Marco Pitteri, after Federiko Benković

The Deux Légendes (French for 'Two Legends') are a pair of pieces for solo piano, (S.175 in the catalogue compiled by Humphrey Searle) by Franz Liszt, written in 1863. In 1863 Liszt made an orchestration of both legendes, S. 113 a/1 and S. 113 a/2.

== No. 1: St. Francis of Assisi's sermon to the birds ==
St. François d'Assise: La Prédication aux oiseaux, S.175/1 is based on the legend Saint Francis Preaching to the Birds. It is said that, one day, while Francis was travelling with some companions, they happened upon a place in the road where birds filled the trees on either side. Francis told his companions to "wait for me while I go to preach to my sisters the birds." The birds surrounded him, intrigued by the power of his voice, and not one of them flew away. The key of the piece is A major, often associated by Liszt with religious sentiment. The piece contains representations of birdsong, one of the few examples in Liszt's works of onomatopaeia.

== No. 2: St. Francis of Paola walking on the waves ==
St. François de Paule marchant sur les flots, S.175/2 is based on a legend of St. Francis of Paola, according to which he was refused passage by a boatman while trying to cross the Strait of Messina to Sicily. He reportedly laid his cloak on the water, tied one end to his staff as a sail, and sailed across the strait with his companions following in the boat. The piece was inspired by a picture owned by Liszt of St. Francis of Paola (who was Liszt's name saint), drawn by Eduard von Steinle. Liszt described it in a letter of 31 May 1860 to Richard Wagner: "On his outspread cloak he strides firmly, steadfastly, over the tumultuous waves - his left hand holding burning coals, his right hand giving the sign of blessing, His gaze is directed upwards, where the word 'Charitas', surrounded by an aureole, lights his way!"
