= Wackersdorf =

- Municipality
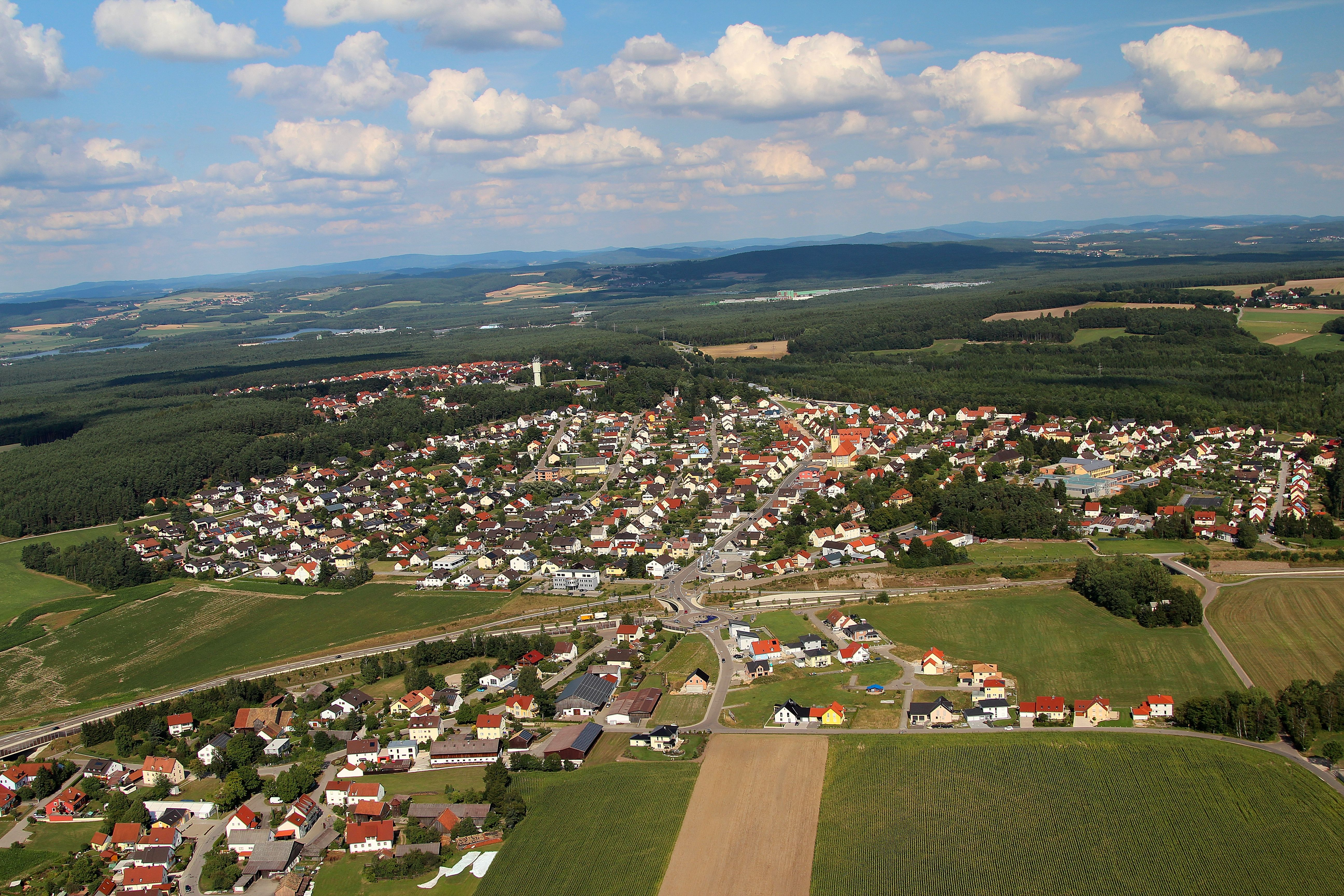
- Aerial view

- Coat of arms

- Location of Wackersdorf within Schwandorf district
- Interactive map of Wackersdorf
- Location within Germany Location within Bavaria
- Coordinates: 49°19′N 12°11′E
- Country: Germany
- State: Bavaria
- Admin. region: Oberpfalz
- District: Schwandorf
- Municipal assoc.: Wackersdorf

Government
  - Mayor (2023–29): Thomas Falter (CSU)

Area
  - Total: 33.56 km^{2} (12.96 sq mi)
- Elevation: 422 m (1,385 ft)

Population (2025-12-31)
  - Total: 5,379
  - Density: 160.3/km^{2} (415.1/sq mi)
- Time zone: UTC+01:00 (CET)
  - Summer (DST): UTC+02:00 (CEST)
- Postal codes: 92442
- Dialling codes: 0 94 31
- Vehicle registration: SAD
- Website: www.vg-wackersdorf.de

Wackersdorf (German pronunciation: [ˈvakɐsdɔʁf]) is a municipality in the district of Schwandorf in Bavaria, Germany. It is known for playing host to rounds of the CIK-FIA Karting European Championship. Wakersdorf was the centre of an Free Republic of Wackerland anti-nuclear demonstration from December 21, 1985 to January 7, 1986.

== See also ==
- Wackersdorf nuclear reprocessing plant
- Anti-nuclear movement in Germany
- Armin Weiss
- Hildegard Breiner
