= Bodenwöhr =

- Municipality
- Coat of arms

- Location of Bodenwöhr within Schwandorf district
- Interactive map of Bodenwöhr
- Location within Germany Location within Bavaria
- Coordinates: 49°16′N 12°19′E
- Country: Germany
- State: Bavaria
- Admin. region: Oberpfalz
- District: Schwandorf
- Subdivisions: 16 Gemeindeteile

Government
  - Mayor (2019–25): Georg Hoffmann (CSU)

Area
  - Total: 54.25 km^{2} (20.95 sq mi)
- Elevation: 374 m (1,227 ft)

Population (2025-12-31)
  - Total: 4,218
  - Density: 77.75/km^{2} (201.4/sq mi)
- Time zone: UTC+01:00 (CET)
  - Summer (DST): UTC+02:00 (CEST)
- Postal codes: 92439
- Dialling codes: 0 94 34
- Vehicle registration: SAD

Bodenwöhr (German pronunciation: [ˈboːdn̩ˌvøːɐ̯]) is a municipality in the district of Schwandorf in Bavaria, Germany.
