= Spaltprozesse =

Spaltprozesse Wackersdorf 001
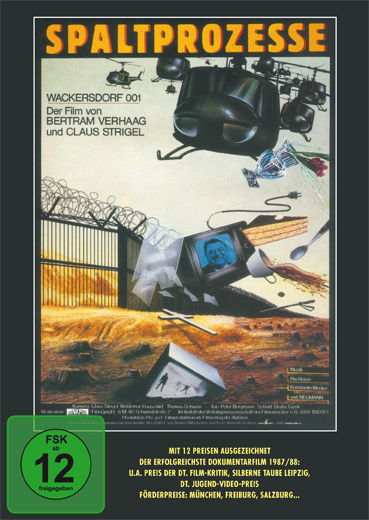
- DVD cover
- Directed by: Bertram Verhaag; Claus Strigel
- Screenplay by: Bertram Verhaag
- Produced by: DENKmal-Film Verhaag GmbH with Pro-ject Filmproduktion
- Music by: Konstantin Wecker; Rio Reiser; Ulrich Bassenge; Wolfgang Neumann
- Release date: 1986 (Germany)
- Running time: 98 minutes
- Country: Germany
- Language: German

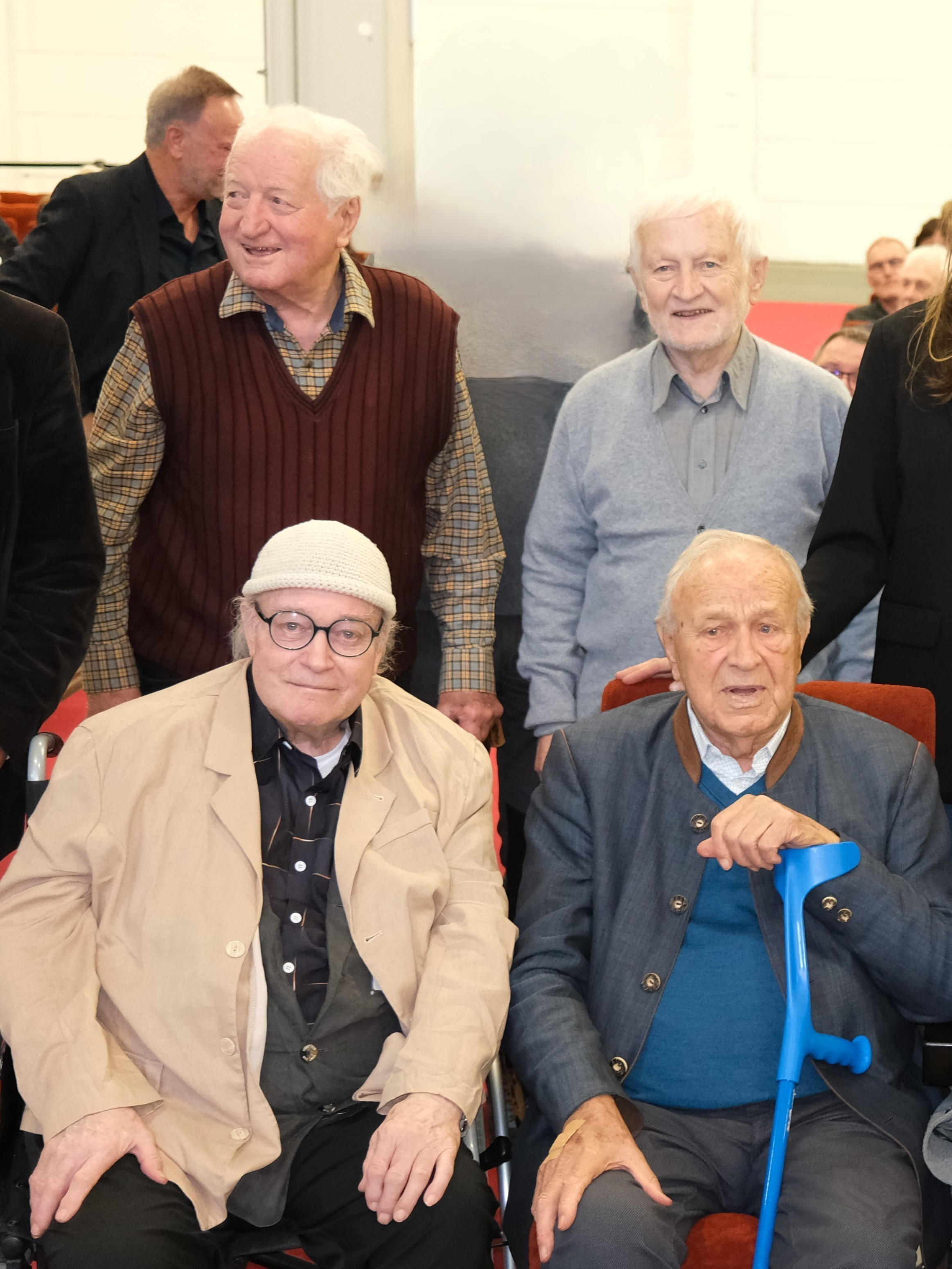
Bertram Verhaag, Hans Schuierer // Leo Feichtmeier, Andreas Schlagenhaufer 2024

Spaltprozesse – Wackersdorf 001 (Fission Processes - Wackersdorf 001) is a 1986 documentary film by directors and producers Claus Strigel and Bertram Verhaag, depicting life in the Upper Palatinate region in Bavaria surrounding the Wackersdorf reprocessing plant (WAA). Fission Processes (cf nuclear fission) is part of the Nuclear power Trilogy, which also includes Restrisiko (Residual Risk, 1989) and Das achte Gebot (The Eighth Commandment, 1991). A fourth film, Halbwertszeiten (Half-Lives), was made in 2006.

== Content and intentions ==
On February 4, 1985, it was announced that the WAA (Wackersdorf nuclear reprocessing plant) was to be built in Wackersdorf. The film "Spaltprozesse" (Fission Processes) describes the nuclear policy intentions and the danger to the population from radioactive emissions, and depicts the ecological and landscape destruction. The focus is on the threatened people and their political and personal processes of change. The title "Spaltprozesse" is ambiguous. On the one hand, it refers physically to the splitting of atomic nuclei, and on the other hand, to the division of society during the conflicts surrounding the WAA. The filmmakers, including Bertram Verhaag, were particularly interested in the question of what happens to a "deference-loving, Catholic population" suddenly confronted with such a WAA project.

Spaltprozesse focuses on the citizens' protests and the changing political consciousness. By depicting the power dynamics between the administration and nuclear companies, the film also sheds light on manifest contradictions between constitutional norms and constitutional reality, thus making an important contribution to political education.

The film uses excerpts from Zaunkämpfe (Fence fights) (Medienwerkstatt Franken), WAAhnsinn – Der Wackersdorf-Film, evidence-gathering videos (Filmstelle PP-Middle Franconia), and excerpts from contemporary reports by ARD and ZDF.

== Characters in the film ==
Hans Schuierer, Karin Rostek (Mother), Armin Weiß (Chemist), Robert Jungk (Futurist), Franz Josef Strauss, Helmut Kohl, Friedrich Zimmermann, Gerold Tandler, Heinz Riesenhuber, Irmgard Gietl (Activist), Joseph Höffner (Cardinal), Gerhard Löwenthal (Presenter, ZDF Magazine), Richard Salzl (Priest), Walter Angebrand (Doctor), Andreas Schlagenhaufer (Priest), Konstantin Wecker (Song: The tree), Rio Reiser (Song: The Dream is over) and others.

== Film screening at the WAA site ==
In 2024, the documentary "Spaltprozesse" (Split Processes) was screened at the former WAA site in the BMW plant, and director Bertram Verhaag answered questions from the audience.

== Awards ==
The documentary won eleven awards and was the most successful documentary film of 1987/88.

- Documentary Film Prize of the City of Munich 1987
- Film of the Month, Jury of the Protestant Film Association 1987
- Prize of the Society for Media Education and Communication Culture (GMK) 1987
- Best Journalistic Achievement, Ökomedia 1987
- Promotional Prize of the City of Freiburg 1987
- Promotional Prize International Youth Film Test 1987
- Preis der deutschen Filmkritik (German Film Critics' Prize), Duisburg Film Week 1987
- Silver Dove, 30th International Leipzig Documentary and Short Film Week 1987
- Summa cum laude, Gold Medal, Medicinale International Parma, 1987
- German Youth Video Prize 1987
- Best Documentary Film 1987 Readers' Jury epd Film
- Highly Recommended, German Film and Media Rating (FBW)

== Literature ==
- Better active today than radioactive tomorrow I. The nuclear power plant protest movement from Wyhl to Brokdorf. Library of Resistance, Volume 18, Film: Split Processes on DVD, Laika-Verlag 2011, ISBN 978-3-942281-01-0
- Bruno Rettelbach: From Palatine to Upper Palatinate. ("Split Processes," pp. 164–168), Norderstedt 2009, ISBN 978-3-8370-5257-2
- Oskar Duschinger: Spaltprozesse - Unacceptable for the police officers (Den Polizeibeamten nicht zumutbar) in: ibid Hans Schuierer – Symbolic Figure of Peaceful Resistance Against the WAA. Book & Art Publishers Oberpfalz 2018, pp. 231-233, ISBN 978-3-95587-063-8.
