= Atomstreit in Wackersdorf – Die Geschichte einer Eskalation =

Atomstreit in Wackersdorf Die Geschichte einer Eskalation
- Screenplay by: Klaus Uhrig
- Release date: 2017 (Germany)
- Running time: 45 minutes
- Country: Germany
- Language: German

Atomstreit in Wackersdorf – Die Geschichte einer Eskalation (The Wackersdorf nuclear dispute – The Story of an escalation) is a 2017 documentary film by IsarFilm Produktion, commissioned by Bayerischer Rundfunk. The film looks back at the conflicts surrounding the planned Wackersdorf reprocessing plant (WAA), which became a symbol of the nuclear power debate.

== Film summary ==
From 1985 to 1989, the Wackersdorf nuclear reprocessing plant (WAA) sparked fierce conflict between the state and the anti-nuclear movement. Thirty years after 1987, this documentary reconstructs the dramatic and sometimes violent escalation surrounding the WAA. The film also explores the political and social context that led to such radicalization. It further highlights parallels with the resistance movements in Gorleben, the Frankfurt Airport runway expansion, and the Chernobyl disaster.

The economic and social consequences of this never-completed mega-project continue to shape the Upper Palatinate region to this day.

== Protagonists ==
- WAA Supporters: Franz Josef Strauss (Bavarian Minister-President), Karl Hillermeier (Bavarian Minister of the Interior), Peter Gauweiler (State Secretary of the Interior), Helmut Kohl (Federal Chancellor)
- Michael Hinrichsen (police officer)
- WAA Opponents: Rebecca Harms (citizens' initiative, Lüchow-Dannenberg), Hans Schuierer (former district administrator, Schwandorf), Wolfgang Nowak (environmentalist), Irmgard Gietl (Schwandorf citizens' initiative), Richard Salzl (pastor), Leo Feichtmeier (pastor), Irene Maria Sturm (Anti-nuclear power plant office Schwandorf), Anna Maria Sturm (child demonstrator), Josef Fischer (farmer from Kölbldorf)
