= Leo Feichtmeier =

- Feichtmeier at the Franziskus-Marterl
- Born: July 28, 1933; Freihung (Bavaria, Germany)
- Died: May 24, 2025 (aged 91); Regensburg
- Occupation: Roman Catholic priest
- Known for: WAA-Priest

Leo Feichtmeier (* July 28, 1933 in Freihung; † May 24, 2025 in Regensburg) was a German Roman Catholic priest and opponent of the nuclear Wackersdorf reprocessing plant (WAA).

== Life and Work ==
Feichtmeier grew up in Freihung (now in the district of Amberg-Sulzbach) with two brothers and a sister. His mother was a seamstress and his father worked for the postal service. At the age of eleven, Feichtmeier entered the boarding school at the Regensburg seminary. After graduating from high school in 1952, he began his novitiate with the Jesuits in Munich, where he studied theology and philosophy. After two years of teaching practice at St. Blasius, he continued his studies in Innsbruck, where he completed them. Two of his brothers also became priests, although his mother was rather critical of the Church. Feichtmeier completed a large part of his priestly training with the Jesuits, after which he decided to become a diocesan chaplain (secular clergy). On June 29, 1964, he was ordained a priest in Regensburg Cathedral. He served as a curate in Windischeschenbach and Roding. From 1970 onward, he was a parish priest and religion teacher at the Regental Gymnasium in Nittenau.

Feichtmeier completed a large part of his priestly formation with the Jesuits, after which he decided to become a diocesan chaplain. Feichtmeier died on May 24, 2025, at the age of 91.

== Critical attitude towards the church ==
Feichtmeier attributed his critical stance towards the Church to his upbringing and training with the Jesuits. He believed the Church was a "feudal system" in which one submits and swallows many things, and one should "not let Rome and the bishops boss one around." He demanded, for example, that the Church deal differently with the shortage of priests. It should heed the proposals of leading theologians and ordain proven married men, and also allow men without a high school diploma to be ordained. Furthermore, every priest should be free to decide whether or not to live celibately, as the current situation was untenable.

Feichtmeier often wrote critical articles for the magazine Pipeline of the Regensburg Action Group. He demanded "much more participation of the grassroots" in the Church, which also required "elevating" the status of women and electing bishops from the laity. Church services also needed to become more vibrant and offer more for young people. “We are a slowly declining church with many elderly people.” He did not see the blessing of same-sex couples as a problem, contradicting his bishop, Rudolf Voderholzer.

He was involved in the Regensburg Action Group and the "We Are Church" movement, among others, and was summoned to the bishop’s office three times.

== Opponents of the Wackersdorf reprocessing plant (WAA) ==
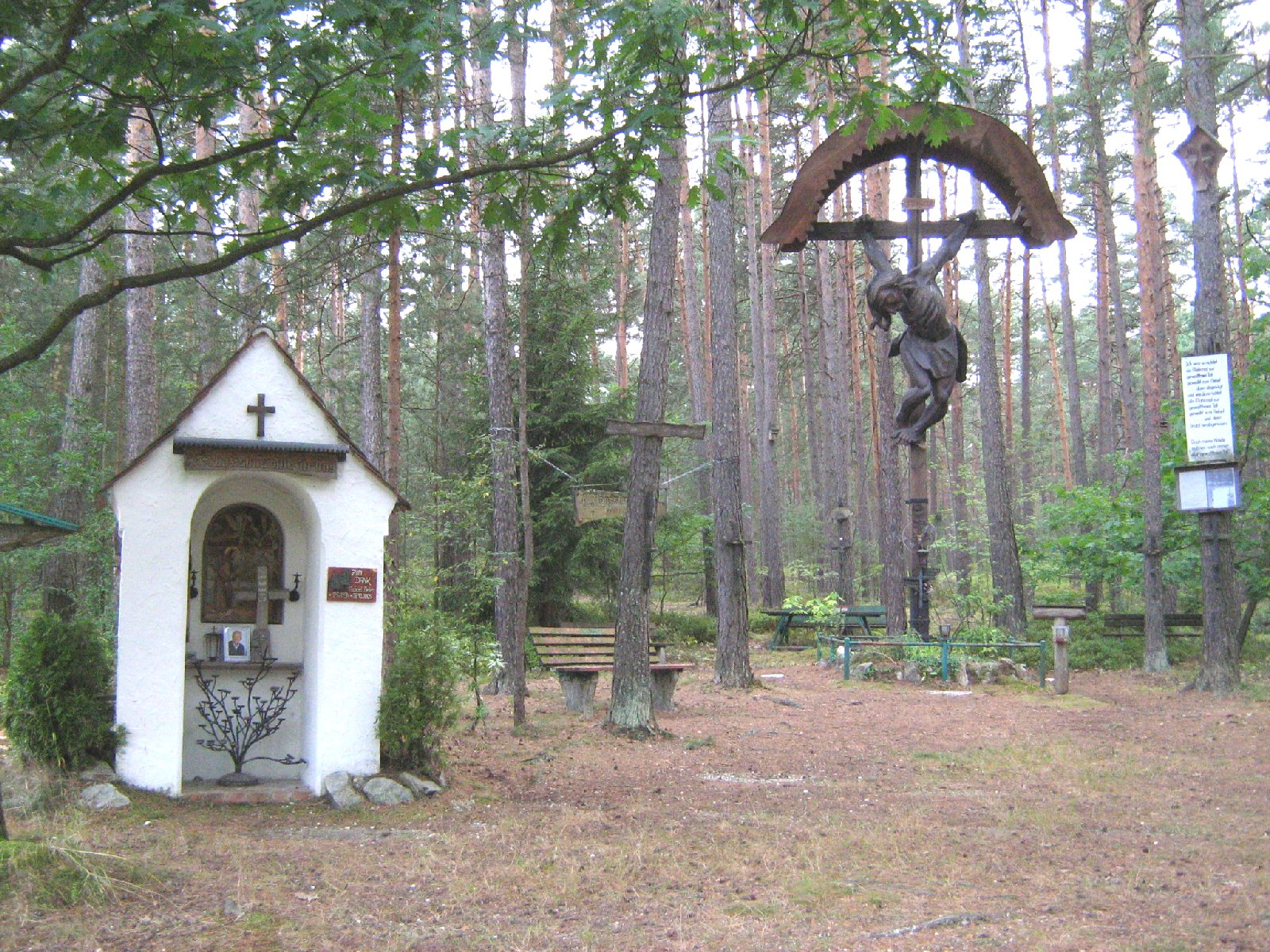
Feichtmeier, among others, held Sunday devotions at the Franziskus-Marterl.

Feichtmeier became known as an opponent of and demonstrator against the Wackersdorf reprocessing plant (WAA) in the 1980s. He was a religion teacher at the Gymnasium (grammar school), a pastor in Nittenau, and active in the Sunday services at the St. Francis Shrine. The Bavarian Ministry of Education initiated disciplinary proceedings against him because he had behaved in an agitational manner and thus violated the duty of restraint stipulated in the Civil Service Act.

Feichtmeier wrote the text for the dedication of the Stolen Cross of Wackersdorf. When the cross was sawn down by the police in the shantytown Free Republic of Wackerland a week later, he read the biblical text about the Deposition of Jesus from the Cross (John 19:38–40) over a loudspeaker. At an ecumenical service in the Schwandorf market square in June 1986, Feichtmeier read the first pastoral letter against the nuclear reprocessing plant in the German-speaking world, written by Bishop Maximilian Aichern of Linz. The vicar general of Regensburg, Fritz Morgenschweis, said he shouldn't interfere "when it comes to our power plant!" He "slowly" began to question the establishment of church leaders and the Christian Social Union (CSU) and lost his fear of those in power.

The priests Leo Feichtmeier, Andreas Schlagenhaufer, Richard Salzl and others held the Sunday ecumenical services at the Franziskus-Marterl. In 1986, the Vicar General of Regensburg, Fritz Morgenschweis, informed the five priests in a letter on behalf of Bishop Manfred Müller that there was no church insurance for those gathered at the Franziskus-Marterl wayside shrine and that Eucharistic celebrations were prohibited on the WAA site.

== Awards and honors ==
Francis of Assisi Memorial Medal for Environmental Protection and Civil Courage (2026, posthumously)

- 2021: Feichtmeier was awarded the Medal of Merit of the Schwandorf district. The citation stated that Feichtmeier had “always encouraged his listeners and students” to form their own opinions: “Thus, he stood at the construction fence as the ‘WAA pastor’ against the resistance of the authorities and preached for the demonstrators.”
- 2024: Feichtmeier was invited to sign the Golden Book of the city of Nittenau.
- 2026 (posthumously): Franziskus-Marterl-Medaille für Umweltschutz und Zivilcourage (Francis of Assisi Memorial Medal for Environmental Protection and Civil Courage); Pastor Andreas Schlagenhaufer accepted the award on behalf of his deceased colleagues.

== Films and documentaries ==
- 2017: Atomstreit in Wackersdorf – Die Geschichte einer Eskalation (Nuclear Dispute in Wackersdorf – The Story of an Escalation), Feichtmeier from minute 10 and 41
- 2018: Inauguration of the Fronberg Solar Park by Leo Feichtmeier and other WAA opponents
- 2018: Eyewitnesses of the WAA Resistance including Leo Feichtmeier, Hans Schuierer, Hubert Weiger
- 2024: Franziskus-Marterl in Wackersdorf: Christian resistance against nuclear power, Deutschlandfunk, series: Day by Day, 2024 with Leo Feichtmeier, Hans Schuierer, Andreas Schlagenhaufer, Wolfgang Nowak

== Publications (selection) ==
- Interview with Leo Feichtmeier, member of the Working Group on Theology and Nuclear Energy in Regensburg, on experiences with the institutional church and secular authorities: A dream of collegiality. in: Roman Arens, Beate Seitz, Joachim Wille: Wackersdorf. The Nuclear State and the Citizens. Essen 1987, ISBN 978-3-88474-424-6, pp. 98–103.
- Leo Feichtmeier – Arbeitskreis Theologie/Kernergie (Leo Feichtmeier – Working Group on Theology/Nuclear Energy), in: Radi Aktiv (magazine), 5/1985, p.34
