= Andreas Schlagenhaufer =

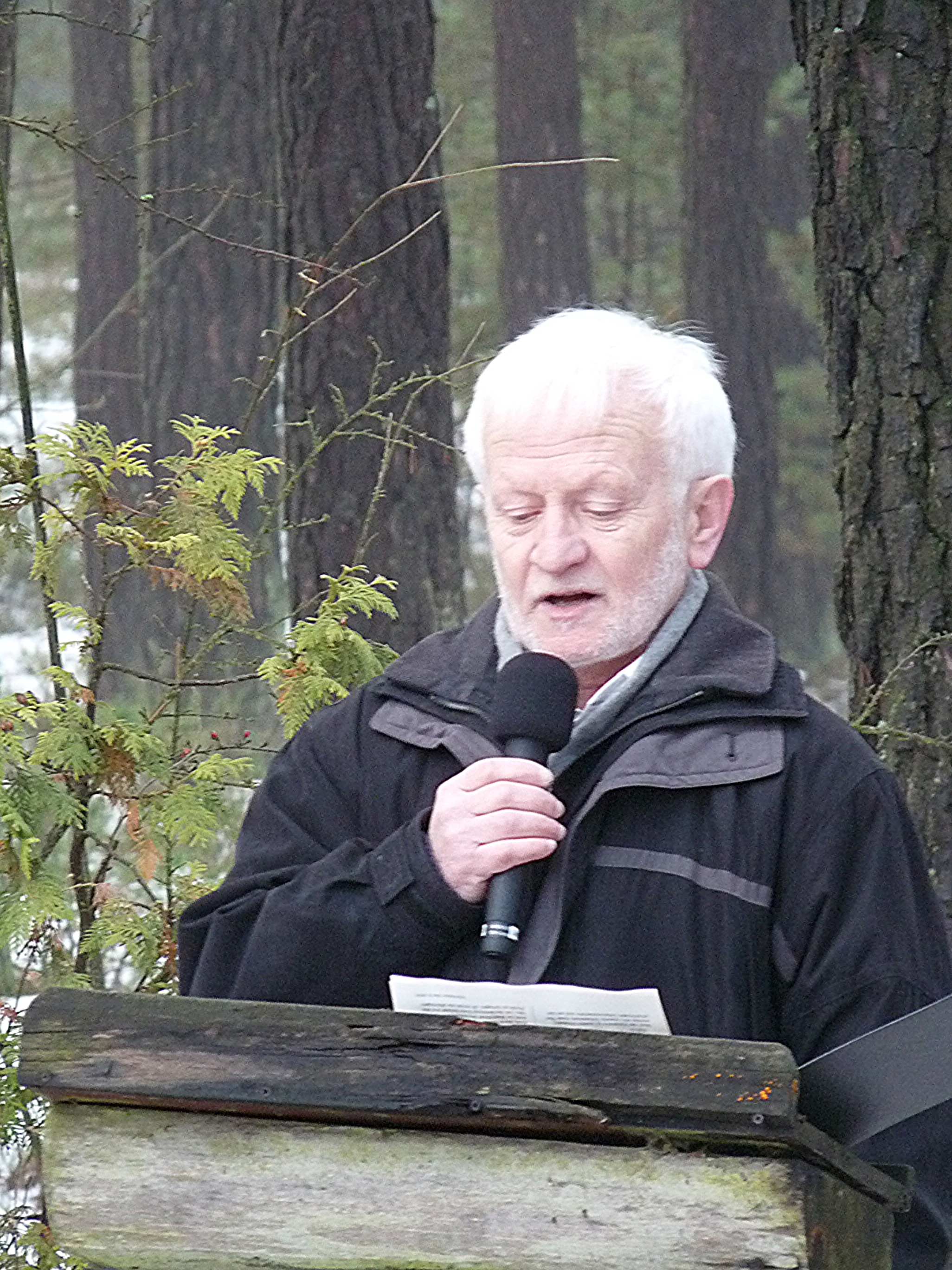
- Andreas Schlagenhaufer at the Franziskus-Marterl
- Born: 1941 (age 84–85); Söllitz-Trausnitz (Bavaria, Germany)
- Occupation: Roman Catholic priest
- Known for: WAA-Priest

Andreas Schlagenhaufer (* 1941 in Söllitz (Trausnitz)) is a Roman Catholic priest and opponent of the nuclear Wackersdorf reprocessing plant (WAA) in Bavaria.

== Personal life and work ==
Schlagenhaufer attended the seminary in Regensburg from 1963 to 1969 and was ordained a priest in 1969. He served as a chaplain in Lappersdorf and then as parish priest in Kohlberg for 34 years. He retired from his priesthood and moved to Regenstauf in 2012.

Schlagenhaufer joined the CSU (which he left twenty years later) and initially held a positive view of nuclear energy. A disappointing conversation with August Lang led him to become involved and join the citizens' initiative (BI) in 1985. He frequently spoke at the BI and, after the WAA (nuclear reprocessing plant) project was abandoned in 1990, joined its board. He was the spokesperson for the "umbrella organization of citizens' initiatives in the Upper Palatinate against the construction of nuclear facilities." While most other citizens' initiatives in the Upper Palatinate dissolved after the WAA ended in the 1990s, Schlagenhaufer remained active in the Weiden-Neustadt citizens' initiative, even though his involvement led to several summonses from the bishop.

In 1990, Schlagenhaufer wanted to run for the Green Party in the district council, but this was forbidden by the church leadership. As recently as 2024, he emphasized the importance of "green"-minded clergy today.

== Resistance against the WAA Wackersdorf ==
Andreas Schlagenhaufer was initially convinced of the positive benefits of nuclear energy. When the nuclear Wackersdorf reprocessing plant (WAA) was to be built near his Upper Palatinate homeland, this attitude changed, and he began to campaign against the WAA.
"That (conscience) was also the decisive factor for me, that I knew I had to get involved, regardless of whether I was praised for it (by the church leadership) or not. Because I realized that it's about life. Life is being damaged here, massively damaged."

Schlagenhaufer was arrested, photographed, and taken to the Federal Border Guard (BGS) barracks in Nabburg during the clearing of the first shantytown at the WAA construction site in 1985. He was not only frequently at the construction site, but also, together with others, tried to explain his position on the WAA to the Bishop of Regensburg and in the Regensburg diocesan newspaper. He even risked his suspension.

Because of his anti-WAA stance and his activism, Schlagenhaufer was summoned to the diocesan office and reprimanded several times by the then Bishop of Regensburg, Manfred Müller. At an event for the film Wackersdorf, Schlagenhaufer said: "We all live on the same earth. We had to get involved!"

== WAA priest at the Franziskus-Marterl ==
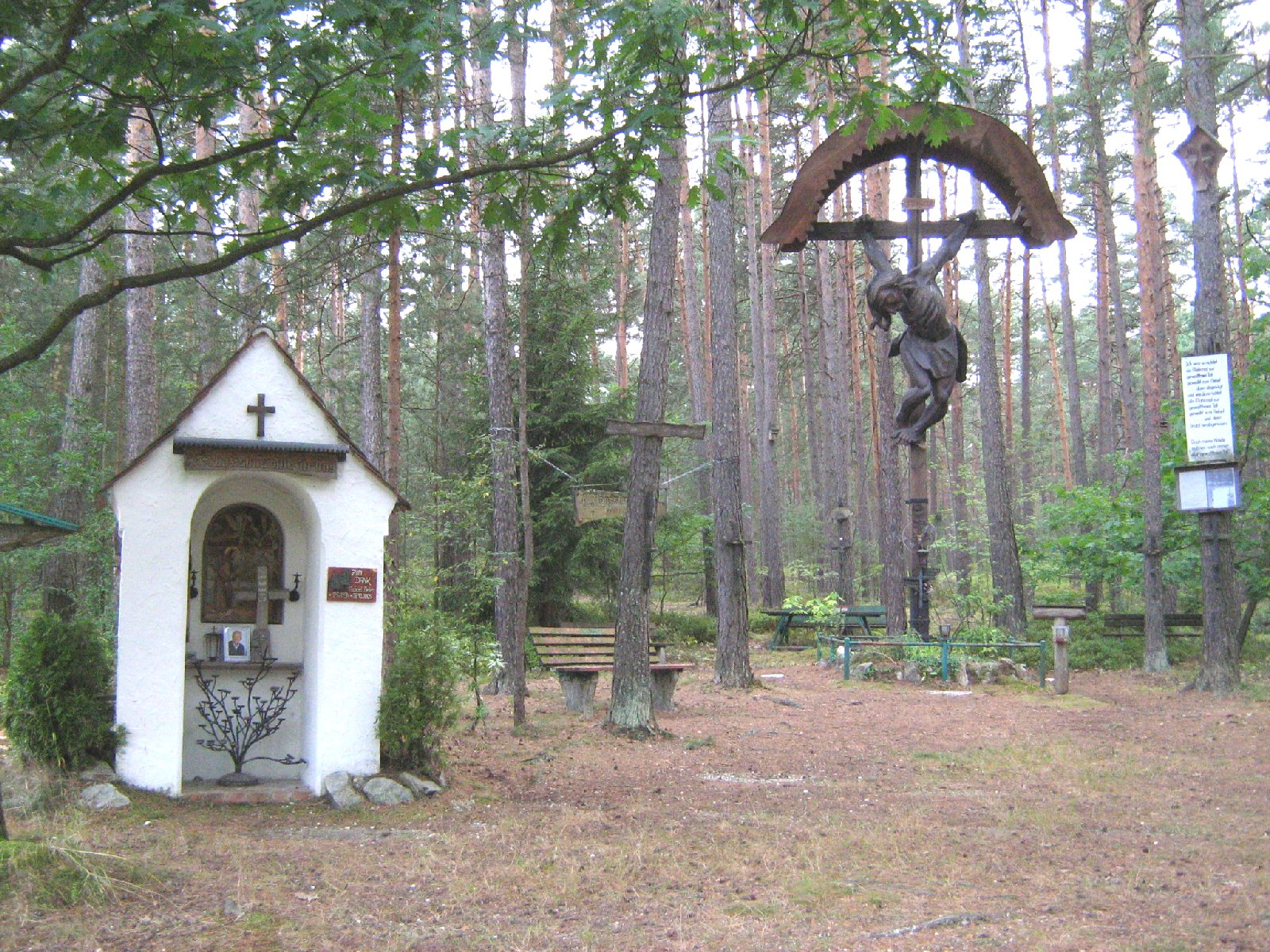
Schlagenhaufer, among others, held Sunday devotions at the Franziskus-Marterl.

Priests Andreas Schlagenhaufer, Leo Feichtmeier, and Richard Salzl are considered key figures in the Christian resistance against the Wackersdorf reprocessing plant (WAA) and, among other things, held Sunday services at the Franziskus-Marterl. Even after the WAA project was abandoned, Schlagenhaufer continued to hold services at the Franziskus-Marterl.

In 1986, Father Schlagenhaufer prayed: “Our bishop said that every stone thrown violates the peace. That is true. Every tree that is senselessly cut down also violates the peace. That, too, is true. Why doesn't our bishop tell the whole truth? If he only emphasizes one aspect, he is serving the business interests of the profit-driven nuclear industry.”

== Critical stance towards the church ==
"Revolutionary" Schlagenhaufer became involved with the "Regensburg Action Group" (AKR) because he felt "that the Council was not being implemented." He was, for a time, editor-in-chief of the AKR magazine "Pipeline," which led to a dispute with Bishop Gerhard Ludwig Müller in 2004.

Regarding the issue of women in the Church, Schlagenhaufer believes that Jesus intended "that women have equal rights. The Catholic Church should implement this so that women can hold the same positions as men."

== Awards and honors ==
Franziskus-Marterl-Medal 2026 at the "God's Bow for the Protection of the Earth"

- 2026: Franziskus-Marterl-Medaille für Umweltschutz und Zivilcourage (Francis of Assisi Memorial Medal for Environmental Protection and Civil Courage)

== Films and documentaries ==
- 1986: Spaltprozesse
- 1986: WAAhnsinn – Der Wackersdorf-Film (Anti-WAAhnsinns Festival)
- 2014: Interview - Main arguments against the WAA Wackersdorf, 3 min
- 2014: Interview - Sunday walks as a form of protest against the WAA and the associated clashes with the police, 3 min
- 2014: Interview - Conflicts with the church leadership that arose as a result of the protests against the WAA, and the importance of one's own freedom of conscience, 2 min
- 2019: 30 years since the end of the WAA, Oberpfalz TV, 1 min
- 2026: 40 years ago - The role of the churches in the Wackersdorf protests, BR24, 3 min
- 2026: The churches and Wackersdorf: 40 years after the Easter protests, BR, 7 min
