= Lex Schuierer =

Lex Schuierer (Law Schuierer) is the unofficial name for the law amending the Bavarian Administrative Procedure Act (BayVwVfG) of July 23, 1985. The law was passed in order to circumvent the blockade of the Wackersdorf reprocessing plant (WAA) by Schwandorf district administrator Hans Schuierer.

== Legal regulation ==
With effect from August 1, 1985, Art. 3b BayVwVfG regulated the so-called self-intervention of the supervisory authorities in order to take action instead of the otherwise responsible authority, in particular a district office.

Until then, it was common, recognized practice for the supervisory authority in the area of state administrative action to take control of a matter and make decisions itself instead of the subordinate state authority. But the Bavarian Administrative Court decided in March 1977 that jurisdiction regulations according to Article 77 Paragraph 1 Sentence 1 of the Bavarian Constitution require an express legal basis. Such a legal basis should be created with Art. 3a BayVwVfG. Until then, there was expressly only a right to supervise and issue instructions.

== History ==
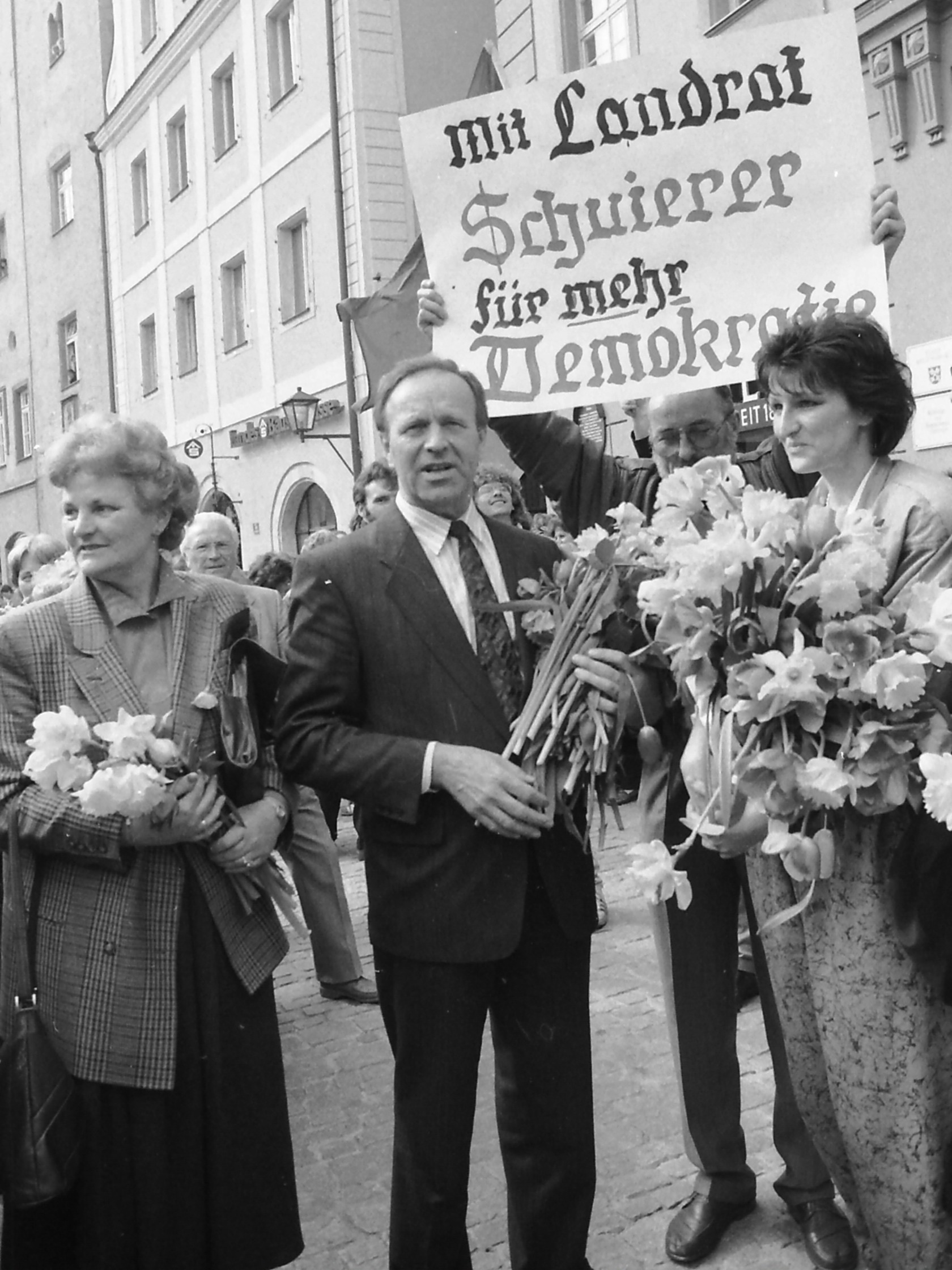
"With District Administrator Schuierer for more democracy" 1989

The regulation, which does not exist in any other state administrative procedure law nationwide, was passed by the Bavarian state parliament in 1985 with the votes of the CSU. The aim was to enable the German Society for the Reprocessing of Nuclear Fuels (DWK) to build the planned Wackersdorf reprocessing plant, regardless of the resistance of the Schwandorf district administrator Schuierer. The DWK is signaled that a location in Wackersdorf is politically and legally feasible.

In September 1984, Schuierer initially refused to publicly display the development plan for the WAA site in the Taxölden Forest, citing his right to protest as a local election official, but relented on instructions from the Bavarian Ministry of the Interior. The plan was approved in April 1985 by the government of the Upper Palatinate under District President Karl Krampol. After Schuierer himself and his deputy Dietmar Zierer refused to issue the building permit despite corresponding instructions, the government of the Upper Palatinate came into force after the Lex Schuierer came into force in October 1985. She had the WAA files sent to her so that she could decide for herself. On October 29, 1985, the government of the Upper Palatinate granted water and building permits for the construction of the WAA. The first partial construction permit under nuclear law, which included the fencing of the construction site, the construction of the fuel element receiving storage facility and the excavation pit for the main process building, was granted by the then Bavarian Environment Minister Alfred Dick in September 1985.

The disciplinary proceedings initiated against Schuierer in May 1986 were only discontinued in April 1989. He described the actions of the Strauss government as “democracy”.

The Lex Schuierer today "theoretically fulfills a new purpose: it gives district administrators who prefer to defer sensitive decisions to a higher authority for political or electoral reasons a scapegoat - the 'evil' Free State or the 'stubborn' minister, for example."

== Legal text ==
Self-entry

(1) If a state authority does not comply with a written instruction from the supervisory authority in a timely manner, the head of the supervisory authority can act in place of the instructed authority (self-intervention).

(2) Self-advocacy against a district office as a state authority is only permitted if the responsible minister considers immediate action to be necessary in an individual case for important reasons of public welfare, particularly in cases of supra-local or national significance, and declares this to the supervisory authority.

The list in paragraph 2 is not exhaustive; Self-intervention is also legally permissible in other cases in which immediate action appears necessary for important reasons of public welfare.

== Weblinks ==
- Wiederaufbereitungsanlage Wackersdorf (Wackersdorf Reprocessing Plant), Historical Lexicon of Bavaria
- Gesetzentwurf Drucksache Nr. 10/5486 vom 10. Dezember 1984. Dokumente zum Vorgang Regelung des Selbsteintrittsrechts von Aufsichtsbehörden im Bereich der staatlichen Behörden. Bayerischer Landtag (Draft bill printed matter No. 10/5486 of December 10, 1984. Documents on the process regulating the right of self-intervention of supervisory authorities in the area of state authorities. Bavarian State Parliament).
- Bayerischer Landtag: Tätigkeitsbericht über die 10. Wahlperiode 1982/86 Zusammenstellung der Gesetzesvorlagen (Bavarian State Parliament: Activity report for the 10th electoral term 1982/86 compilation of legislative proposals), p. 29
