= Kreuzberg Church, Schwandorf =

Church in Schwandorf, Germany

Coordinates: 49°19′12″N 12°06′59″E

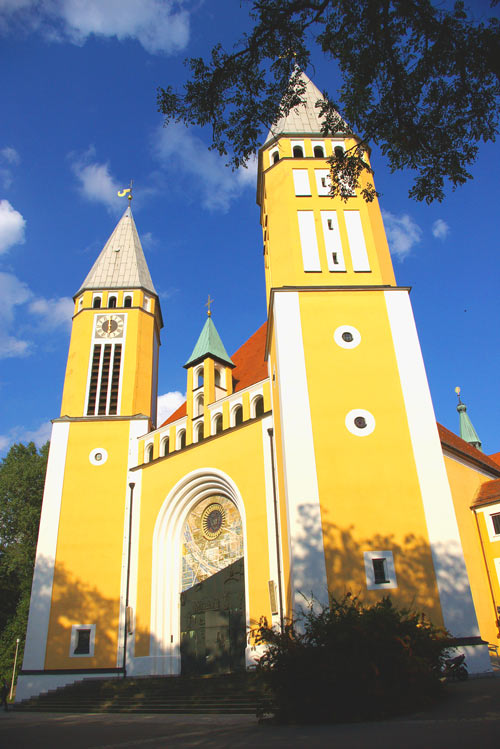
Kreuzberg Church, Schwandorf

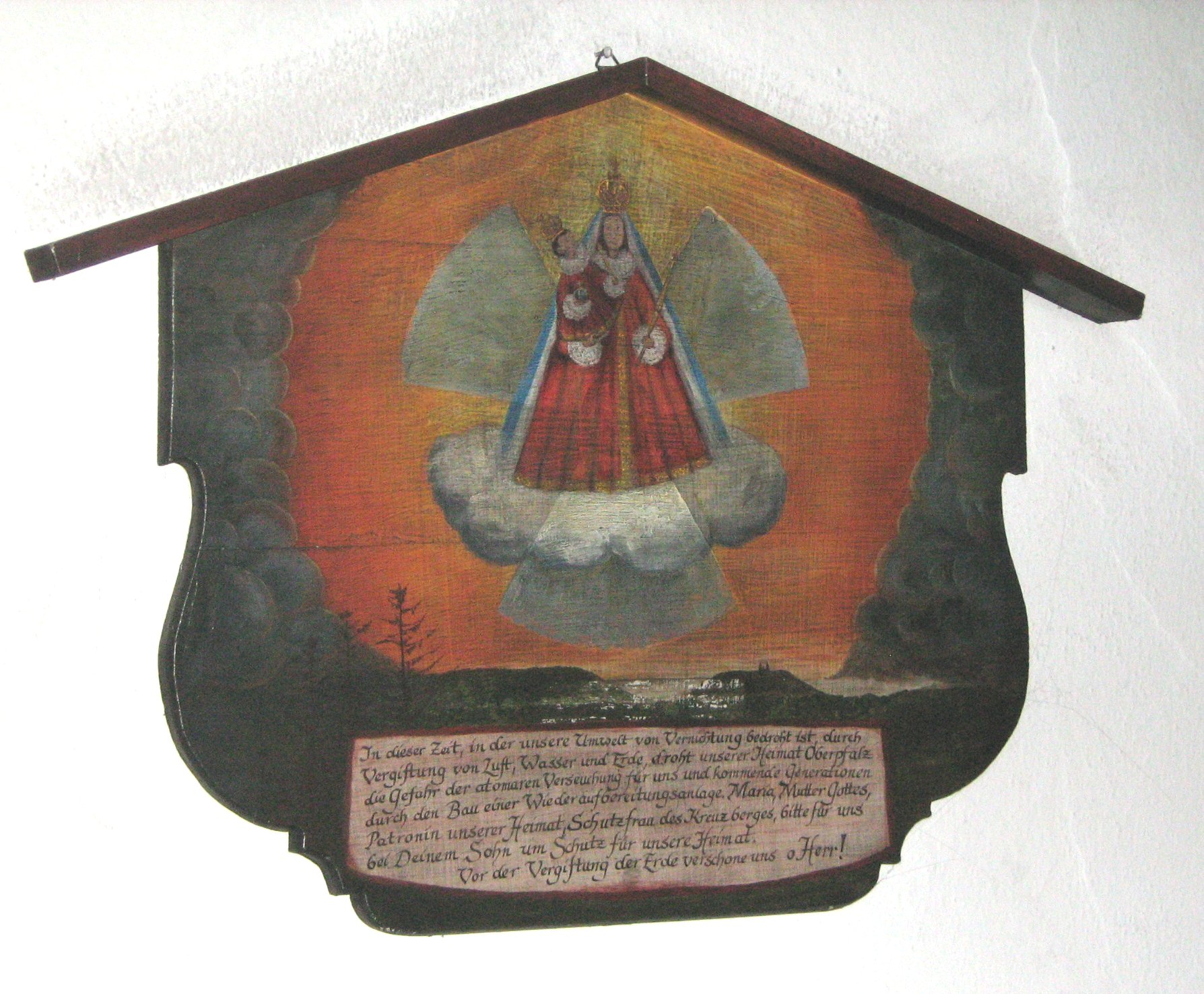
Ex-voto opposing the nuclear reprocessing plant at Wackersdorf

Kreuzberg Church, Schwandorf (German: Wallfahrtskirche Zu Unserer Lieben Frau vom Kreuzberg) is a Catholic parish church, monastic church and pilgrimage church dedicated to Mary Help of Christians on the Kreuzberg ("Hill of the Cross") in Schwandorf in Bavaria, Germany.

== History ==
The first chapel on the Kreuzberg was built by the townsfolk between 1678 and 1680 to house an image of the Virgin Mary (a replica of the image of 'Mariahilf' by Lucas Cranach the Elder in Innsbruck Cathedral), and quickly developed as a destination of pilgrimage, to the extent that as early as 1697–1699 the chapel had to be enlarged. Another extension took place in 1784.

The Baroque church was almost completely destroyed in a bombing raid in 1945, although the image of Maria remained intact. From 1949 to 1952 it was rebuilt in a modern style.

The church serves not only as a place of pilgrimage but also as a parish church and as the church of the nearby Carmelite convent.

On July 19, 1979, Pope John Paul II conceded that the venerated image of the 'Mariahilf' in the church may be honored with a canonical coronation, through a decree issued by the Sacred Congregation for the Sacraments and Divine Worship to the Diocese of Regensburg. The coronation ceremony was held shortly after on August 8.

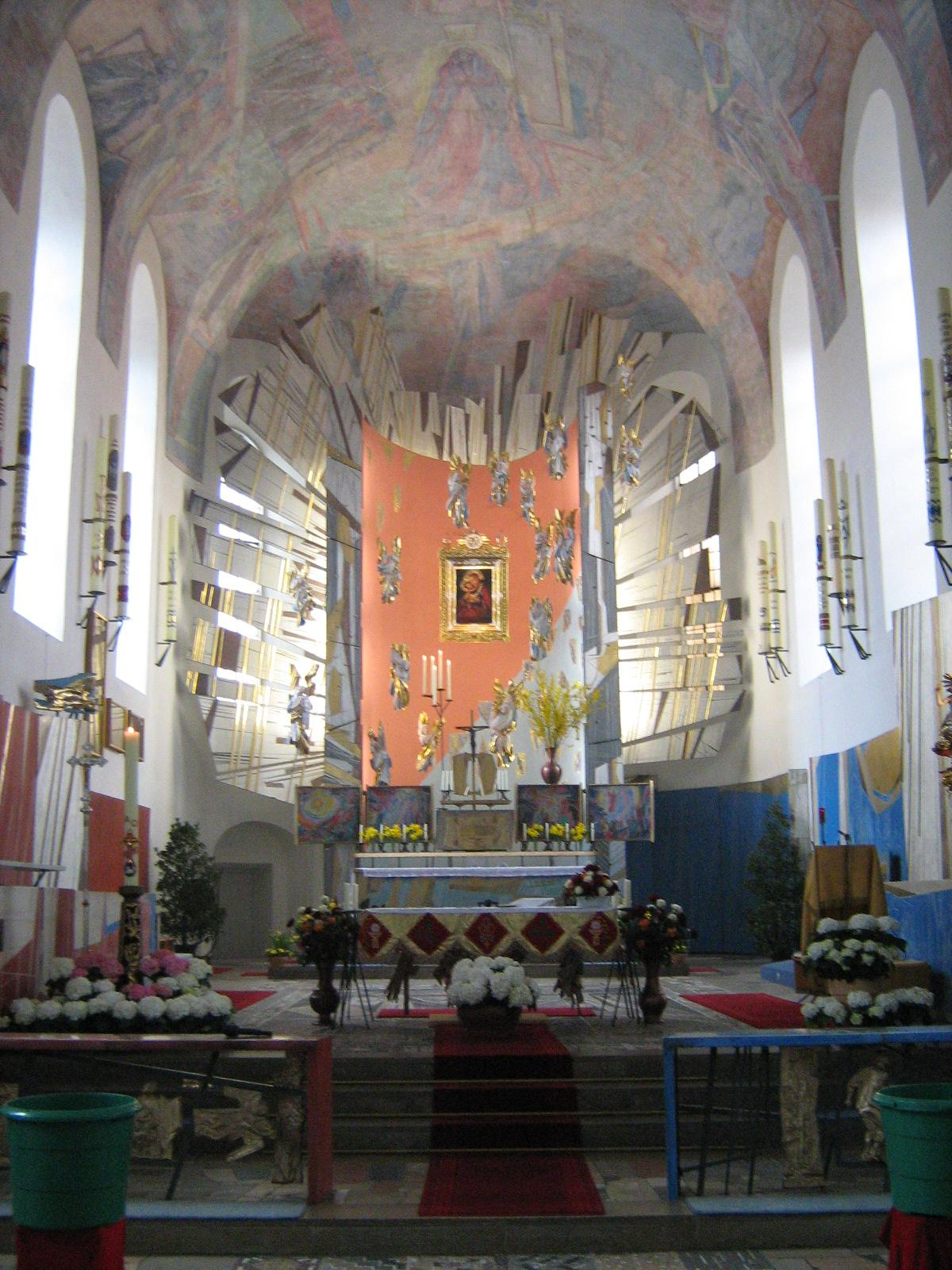
Interior

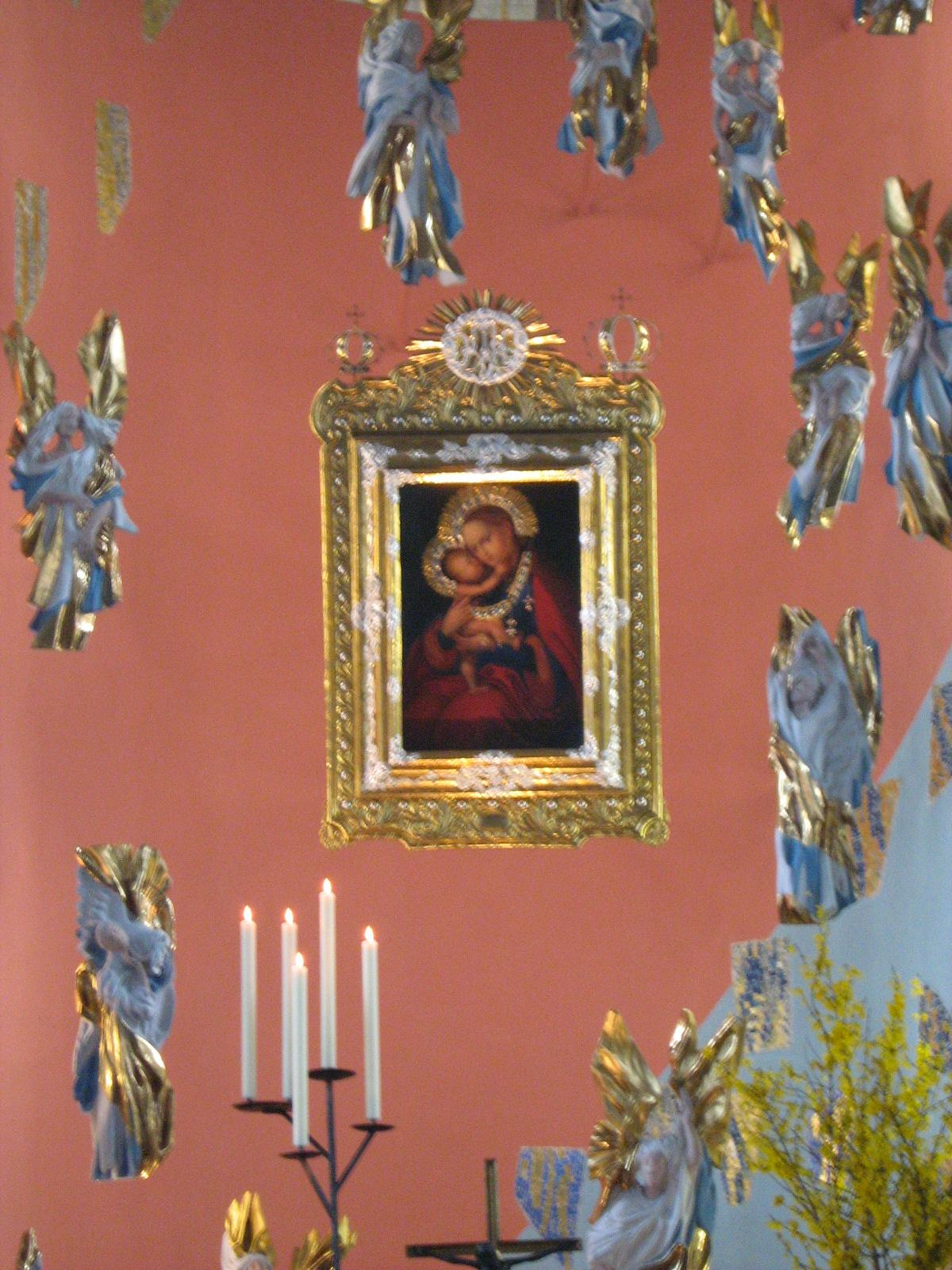
Our Lady Help of Christians
