= Hans Schuierer =

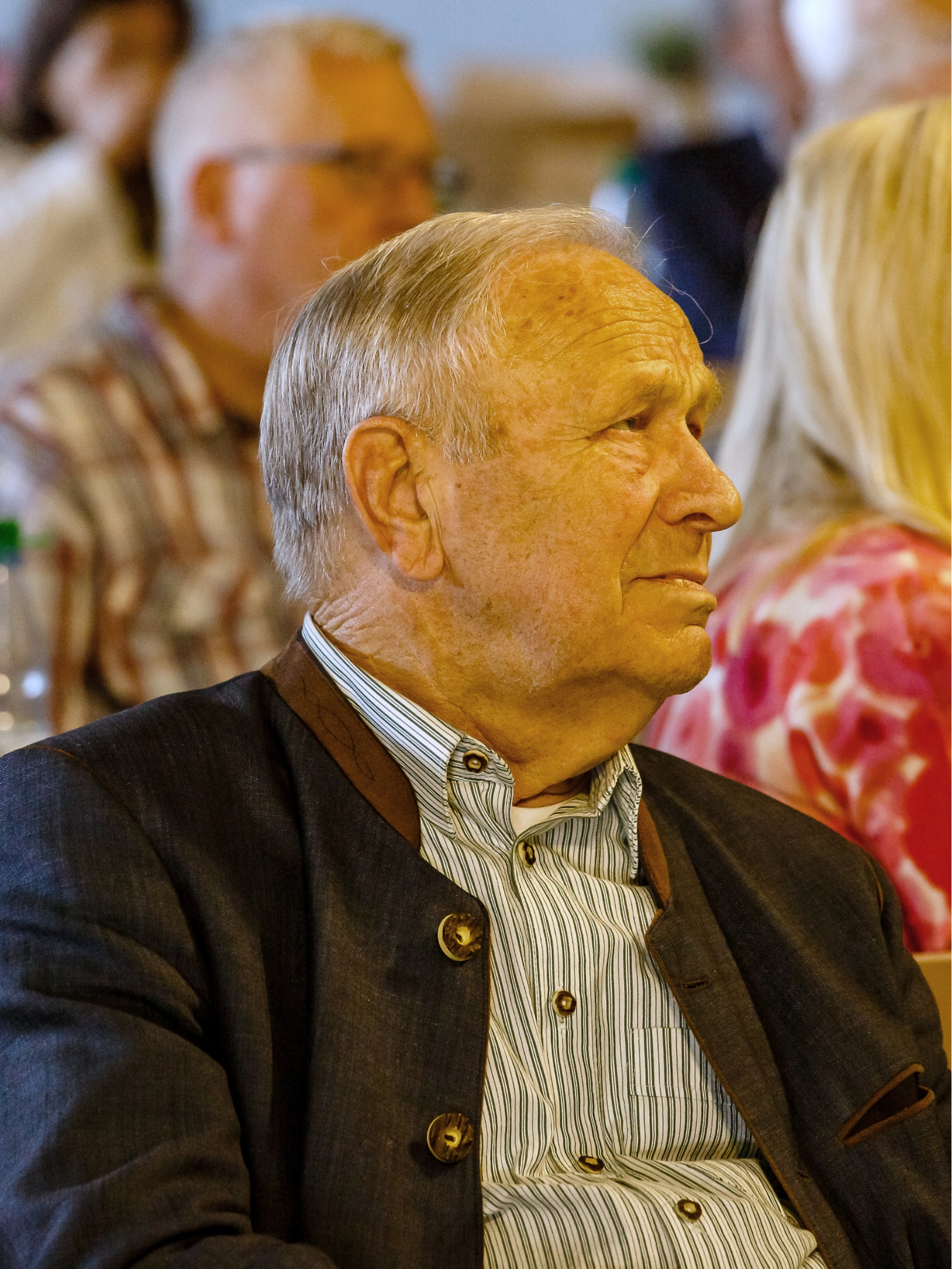
- Hans Schuierer 2019

Landrat of Schwandorf (district)
- In office 1972–1996

Personal details
- Born: 6 February 1931 (age 95) Klardorf, Bavaria, Germany
- Party: Social Democratic Party (SPD)

Hans Schuierer (born 6 February 1931 in Schwandorf-Klardorf) is a former German local politician of the Social Democratic Party (SPD). He was the Landrat (district administrator) of the Schwandorf district (Bavaria) from 1972 to 1996 and became known as an opponent of the Wackersdorf reprocessing plant (WAA).

== Personal life ==
Schuierer trained as a bricklayer and road builder. In 1956, he entered local politics, initially as a member of the municipal council, then shortly thereafter as the first mayor of Klardorf (now part of Schwandorf), and subsequently as district administrator of the Burglengenfeld district. From the 1972 regional reform, Schuierer served as district administrator of the Schwandorf district in the Upper Palatinate. He gained nationwide notoriety in the mid-1980s when he rejected a permit for the Wackersdorf reprocessing plant (WAA). For four years, he defied the directive of the Bavarian state government and, despite disciplinary proceedings initiated against him, did not waver from his position.

Schuierer spent his retirement in his hometown, which is now part of Schwandorf. Until 2008, he served on the Upper Palatinate District Council. In 2011, he was made an honorary citizen of Schwandorf.

== WAA resistance and "Lex Schuierer" ==
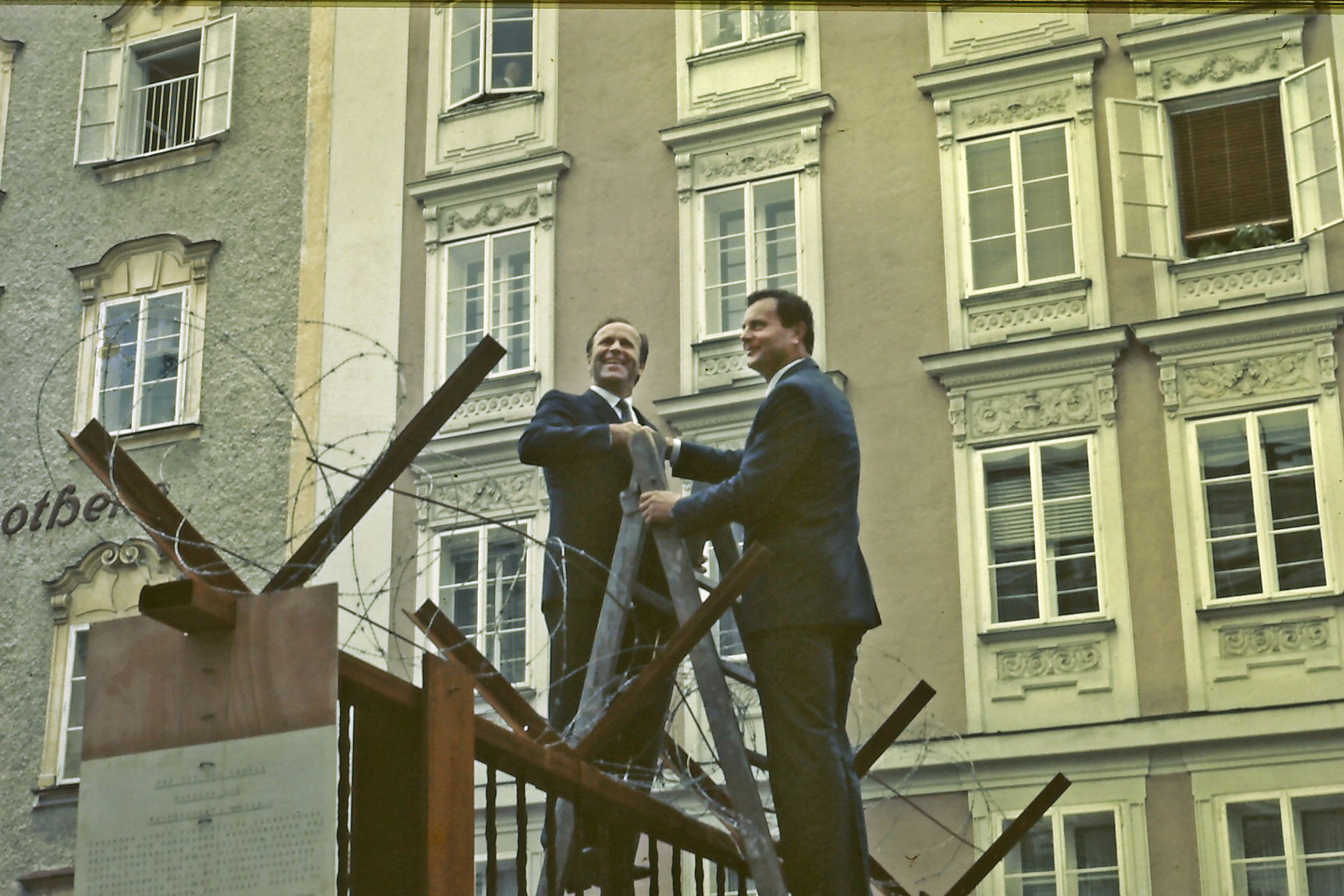
Anti-nuclear partnership: Hans Schuierer and Mayor Josef Reschen (Salzburg, 1986)

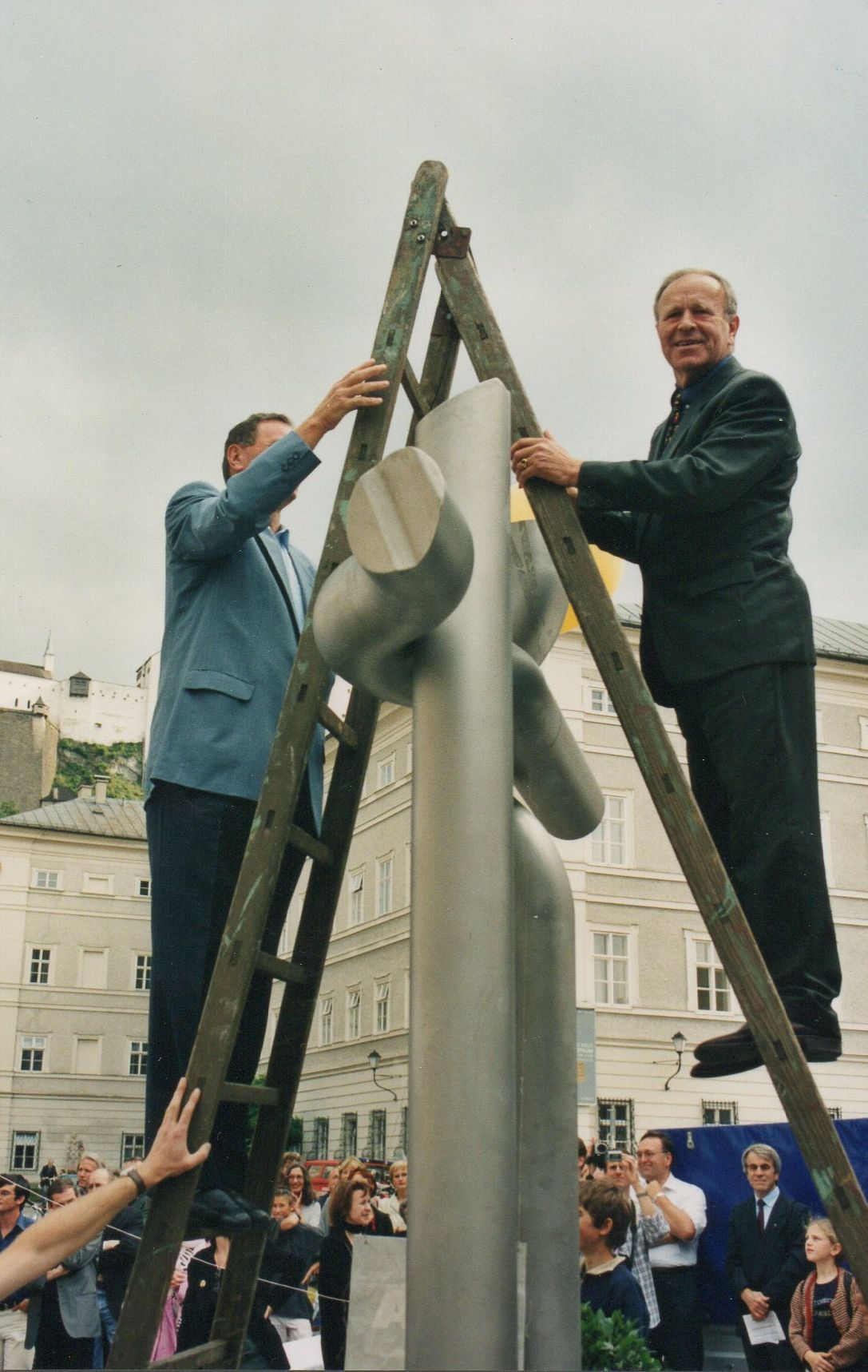
Mayor Josef Reschen and Hans Schuierer at the Wackersdorf Memorial (Salzburg, 2000)

Although Schuierer initially supported the Wackersdorf reprocessing plant (WAA), he described it as economic nonsense in 1985 and believed it would never go into operation. Schuierer and his deputy, Dietmar Zierer, refused to sign the water and building permits for the construction of the Wackersdorf WAA until the Bavarian state government circumvented this with the "Lex Schuierer".

The "Lex Schuierer" introduced Article 3a into the Bavarian Administrative Procedure Act, allowing supervisory authorities to intervene themselves. This means that if a subordinate district office, acting as a state authority, fails to act even after being instructed to do so, the district government can make a decision itself. After the law came into effect on August 1, 1985, the Upper Palatinate government issued the water and building permits in October 1985 instead of the Schwandorf district office. His representative Zierer assessed this approach with the polemical words: "A dictatorship would not have behaved much differently."

The SPD district administrator was subjected to several disciplinary proceedings. Schuierer held the view that the difference between Chile, South Africa, and other military dictatorships and the Free State of Bavaria was "becoming ever smaller". He clashed with the WAA supporter Franz Josef Strauss and spoke of "one-man democracy of the Strauss type", "CSU democracy", and "terror in its purest form". Conversely, Strauss and his Interior Minister August Lang called Schuierer a "supporter of communism", "inciter of hatred", and "ringleader" and accused him of "sabotage". During the civil-military WINTEX exercise, an attack by a heavily armed peace initiative on Schuierer was "coincidentally" simulated in the basement of the district administration building.

Schuierer joined the citizens' initiatives at the information booth and supported the shantytowns. In retrospect, Schuierer considered the WAA (nuclear reprocessing plant) "a complete and utter pack of lies from beginning to end." However, he was surprised that prominent figures such as Hans-Jochen Vogel, Johannes Rau, Joschka Fischer, Petra Kelly, Karl-Heinz Böhm, and Dietmar Schönherr came to visit him and protest against the WAA.

Together with his fellow campaigner Wolfgang Nowak, Schuierer visited schools and events to ensure that the memory of the fight for their Upper Palatinate homeland would not be forgotten.

In the feature film Wackersdorf by Oliver Haffner, Hans Schuierer was portrayed by Johannes Zeiler.

== Awards and honors ==
- 1987: Wilhelm Dröscher Prize
- 2005: Wilhelm Hoegner Prize of the SPD Parliamentary Group
- 2005: Order of Merit of the Federal Republic of Germany
- 2011: Honorary citizenship of the City of Schwandorf
- 2014: Honorary Award of the Nuclear-Free Future Award for Lifetime Achievement
- 2019: Sepp Daxenberger Prize
- 2019: Bayerische Verfassungsmedaille (Bavarian Constitution Medal) in Silver
- 2026: Bayerische Naturschutzmedaille (Bavarian Nature Conservation Medal)

== Film documents ==
- 2014: Speech by Hans Schuierer on the 25th anniversary of the WAA Wackersdorf construction halt, 34 min
- 2016: 30th anniversary of the WAA construction halt, Oberpfalz TV, 3 min
- 2018: Wackersdorf (film) – The feature film shows how Hans Schuierer, the district administrator of Schwandorf, fought against the Wackersdorf reprocessing plant (WAA). 122 min
- 2018: Living History: Hans Schuierer, the former district administrator of Wackersdorf, remembers. 24 min
- 2018: Hans Schuierer talks about the Wackersdorf reprocessing plant, 8 min
- 2018: Book presentation: Hans Schuierer – Symbolic figure of peaceful resistance against the WAA. 7 min
- 2018: Hans, stay here... Title song and video for the book "Hans Schuierer", Music: "GAMPE – Americana from Bavaria", 5 min
- 2018: Irmgard and the Resistance Socks, documentary from the BR television series "Lebenslinien" (Lifelines) 2018 with Hans Schuierer, 44 min
- 2019: End of the WAA - Hans Schuierer and catholic priest Richard Salzl at the final demonstration at the construction fence, BR24, 2 min
- 2019: The anti-nuclear protesters who won, BBC 2019, 10 min
- 2021: Hans Schuierer's 90th Birthday, BR Television, 2 min
- 2022: 33 years since the construction halt of the reprocessing plant in Wackersdorf, among others with Hans Schuierer, Oberpfalz TV, 12 min
- 2022: Hans Schuierer: The Man Against the Nuclear Plant - Based on a True Story, Arte, 27 min
- 2025: Decision on the Wackersdorf reprocessing plant site (1985), reactions from Hubert Weinzierl and Hans Schuierer, BR24, 2 min
- 2026: Hans Schuirer turns 95!, OTV, 2 min
- 2026: 40 years after the Easter Monday demonstration: Hans Schuierer from BUND Naturschutz honored, OTV, 3 min

Eyewitness interviews with Hans Schuierer

- 2014: Schuierer reports on the clearing of the second shantytown (Free Republic of Wackerland), the harsh crackdown by the police, criminal charges against police officers, and injured demonstrators. HdBG 2014, 4 Min
- 2014: Schuierer reports on the heated confrontations with Minister-President Franz Josef Strauss (CSU). HdBG 2014, 4 Min
- 2014: Schuierer reports on the particular brutality of the special police units from Berlin that were deployed against demonstrators in 1987. HdBG 2014, 4 Min
- 2025: Interview by Michael Sterner with Hans Schuierer 2025, 6 min

== Literature ==
- Oskar Duschinger: Incorruptible – Hans Schuierer. A Life for the Citizens and Against the WAA. Burglengenfeld 1986, ISBN 3-925603-03-4.
- Oskar Duschinger: Hans Schuierer – Symbolic Figure of Peaceful Resistance Against the WAA. Book & Art Publishers Oberpfalz 2018, ISBN 978-3-95587-063-8.
- "When I perceive injustice, I am obliged to resist!" Interview with Hans Schuierer, Radi Aktiv 1986
