= Richard Salzl =

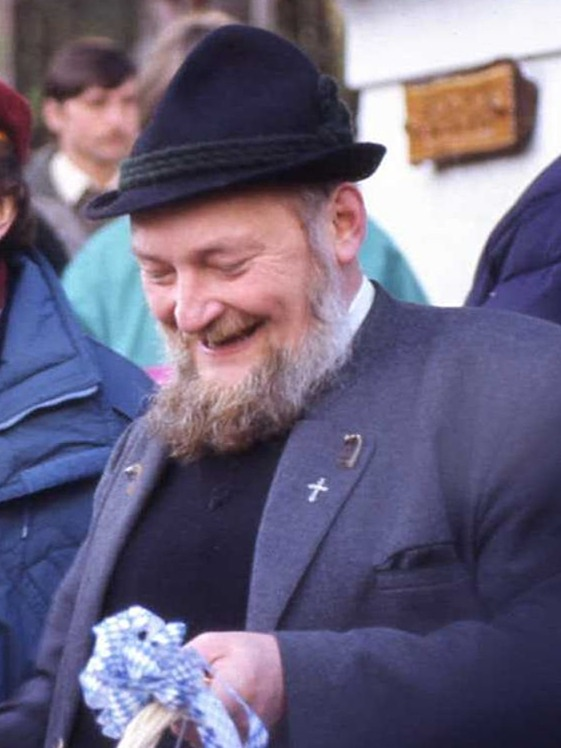
- Richard Salzl at the Franziskus-Marterl
- Born: January 30, 1940; Amberg (Bavaria, Germany)
- Died: September 12, 2023 (aged 83); Regensburg
- Occupation: Roman Catholic priest
- Known for: WAA-Priest

Richard Salzl (born January 30, 1940 in Amberg; died September 12, 2023, in Regensburg) was a Bavarian Roman Catholic priest and an activist against the Wackersdorf reprocessing plant (WAA) in Bavaria. "WAA Pastor" Salzl was one of the symbolic figures of the Christian resistance against the WAA.

== Personal life and work ==
Salzl was born in Amberg (Upper Palatinate), attended primary school, and trained in the trades of stove builder and tiler. At the age of 25, against his parents' wishes, he decided to become a priest and attended a secondary school for late vocations in Waldram (Wolfratshausen). Richard Salzl was ordained a priest in 1976 at the age of 36. From 1976 to 1980, he served as a curate and youth chaplain in Viechtach, and later as a chaplain for the Catholic Rural People's Movement (Katholische Landvolkbewegung). Subsequently, he served as parish priest in Penting (Neunburg vorm Wald) and Seebarn (Neunburg vorm Wald) from 1980 to 2010. He also held the title of Honorary Rural Chaplain for the Schwandorf district association. Father Salzl retired in 2010, moved to Schmidgaden, and regularly assisted with church services in the Rottendorf (Schmidgaden) parish community. In 2015, he moved to Dürnsricht (Fensterbach) with his housekeeper, Gisela Beer.

== WAA protest - Franziskus-Marterl ==
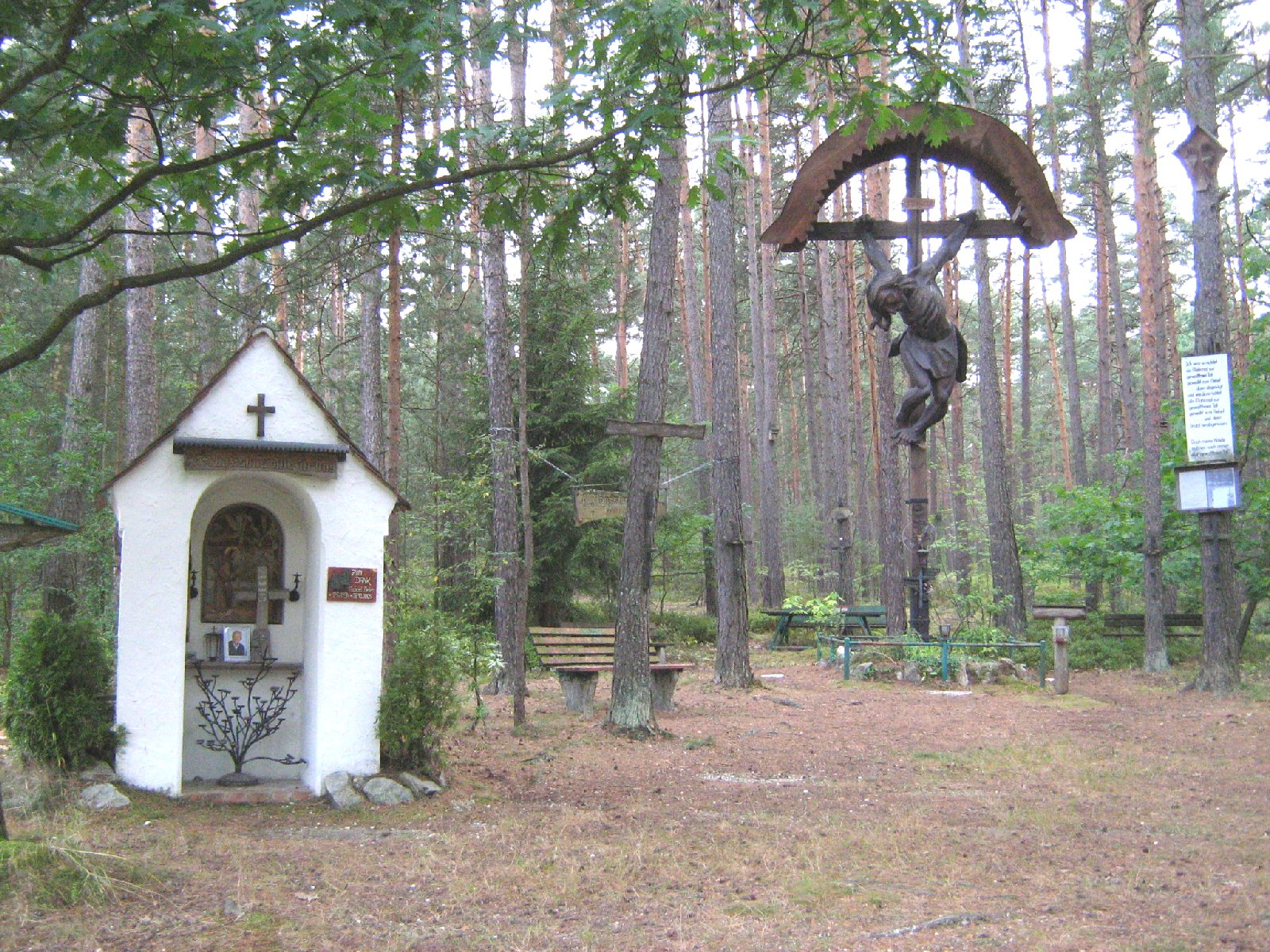
Franziskus-Marterl against the WAA

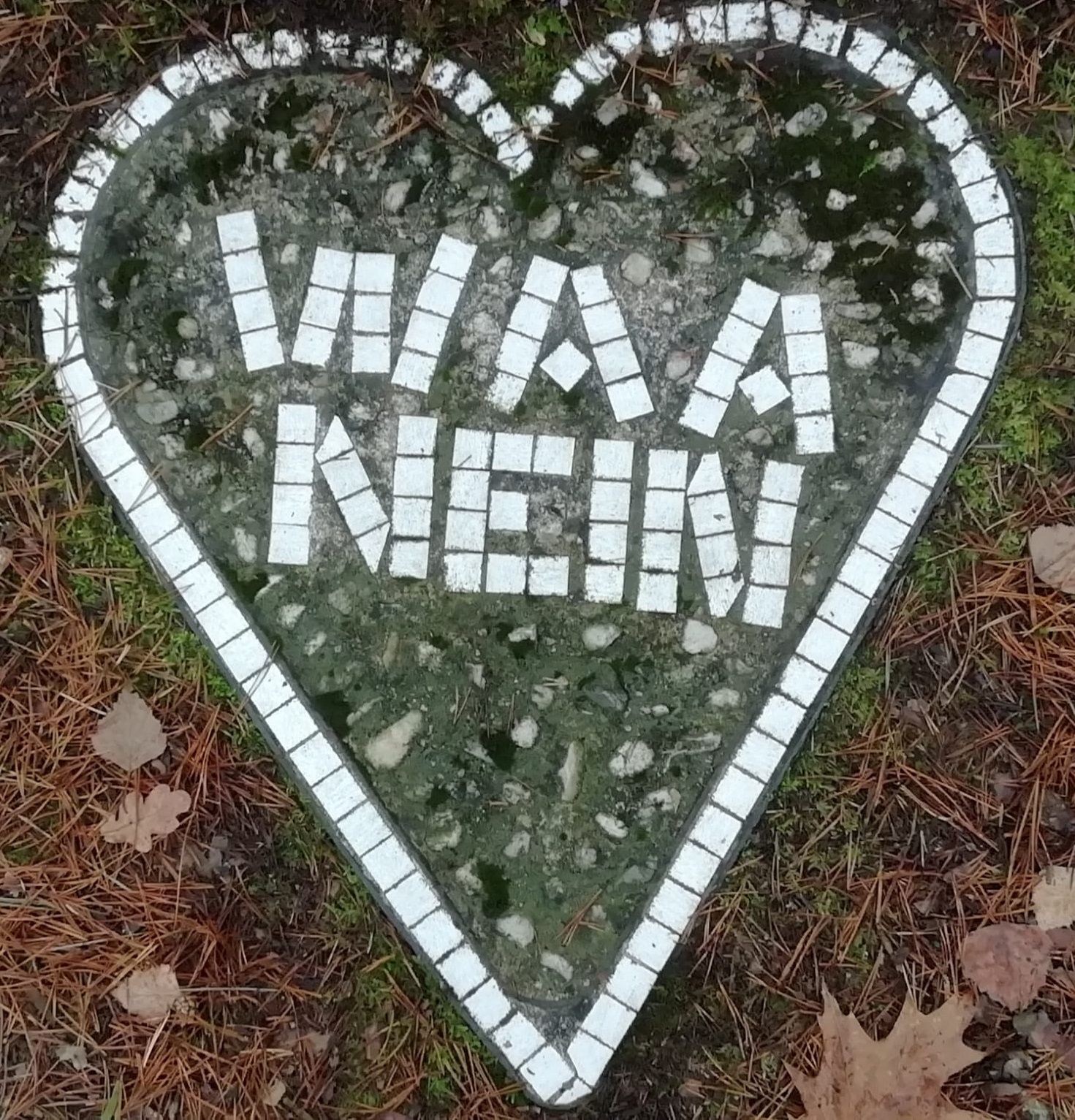
WAA NO mosaic by Richard Salzl at the Cross of Wackersdorf

Father Salzl, a trained craftsman, built 1984 the Franziskus-Marterl (St. Francis wayside shrine) with the help of a few assistants over the course of 14 days. On October 2, 1984, Salzl, together with Matthias Kietz (protestant priest), consecrated the Franziskus-Marterl on Michael Meier's property, adjacent to the WAA site.

Starting at Christmas 1984, ecumenical prayer services were held there regularly, and soon people began gathering every Sunday to talk, seek counsel, and pray. Salzl gained nationwide recognition as the "WAA Pastor." Appearing as a private citizen without a stole he frequently conducted Sunday ecumenical services at the Franziskus-Marterl, often alongside other clergy members such as Andreas Schlagenhaufer and Leo Feichtmeier.

== Films and documentaries ==
- 1986: Spaltprozesse (Documentary film; Salzl appears at min. 12, 54, 97)
- 2017: Atomstreit in Wackersdorf – Die Geschichte einer Eskalation (Documentary film; Salzl appears at min 6)
- 2018: Students have restored the Franziskus-Marterl - Pastor Salzl explains the image of St. Francis, 3 min
- 2019: Pastor Salzl celebrates the WAA shutdown at the construction fence, BR24, 2 min
- 2024: Franziskus-Marterl in Wackersdorf: Christian resistance to nuclear power, 10 min

== Awards and honors ==
Franziskus-Marterl-Medal 2026 (posthumously)

- 2026 (posthumously): Franziskus-Marterl-Medaille für Umweltschutz und Zivilcourage (Francis of Assisi Memorial Medal for Environmental Protection and Civil Courage); Pastor Andreas Schlagenhaufer accepted the award on behalf of his deceased colleagues.
