= Radi Aktiv (magazine) =

Bavarian anti-nuclear magazine

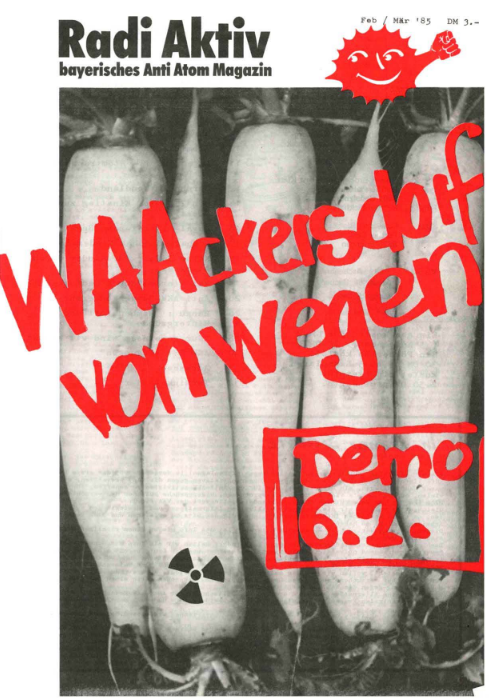
Radi (Radish) Aktiv 1/1985

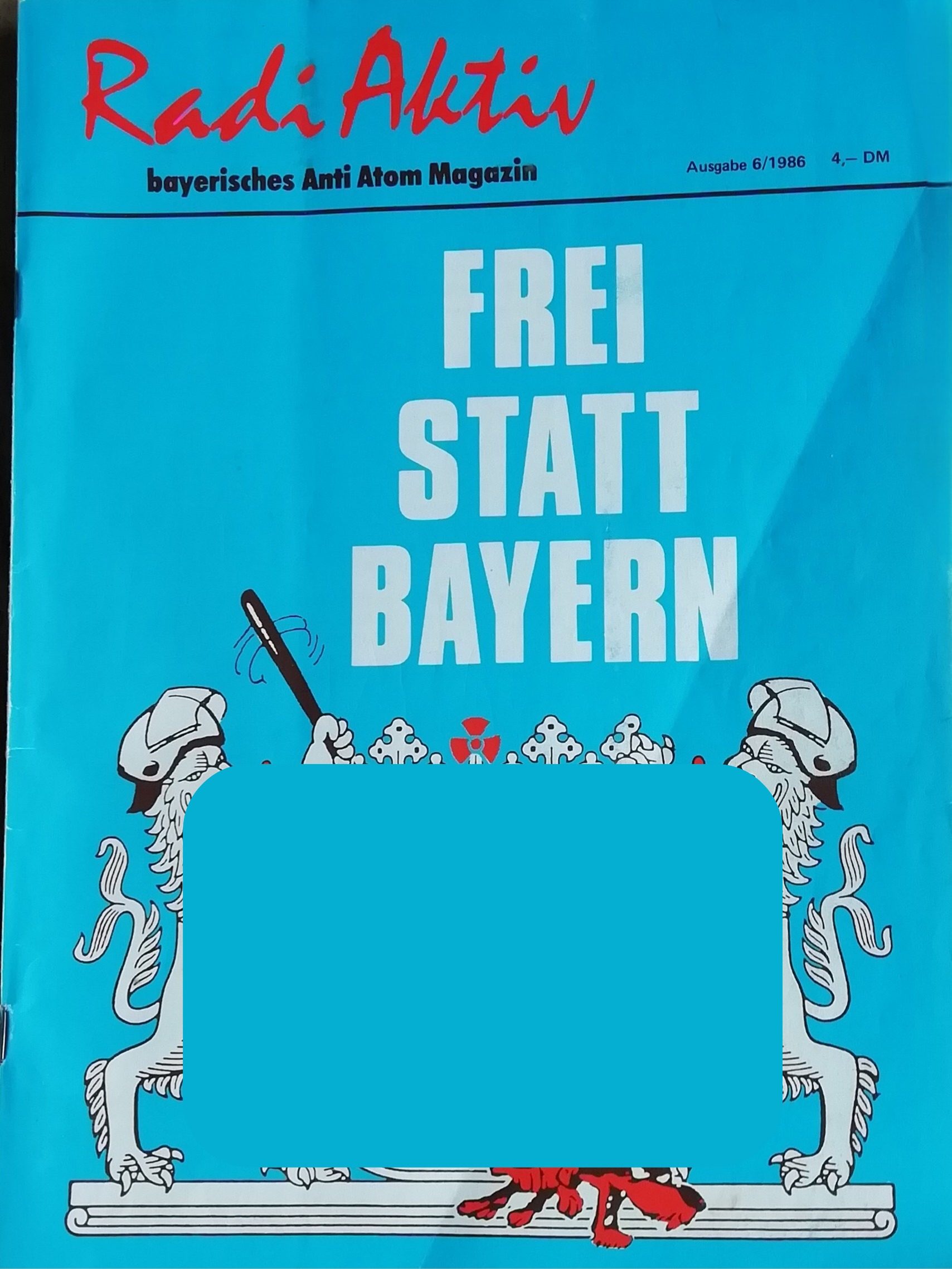
Radi Aktiv 6/1986

Radi Aktiv was a Bavarian anti-nuclear magazine. The name Radi Aktiv is composed of radish and activity and refers to the word radioactivity.

== History ==
Radi Aktiv was published between 1985 and 1990 and reported on, among other things, the events and the struggle against the Wackersdorf reprocessing plant (WAA). The magazine was published by the Bavarian State Conference of Anti-Nuclear Power Plant Citizens Initiatives (LAKO). The Nuremberg Initiative Against Nuclear Facilities (NIGA) served as editor.

== Legal Disputes ==
The editors repeatedly faced legal disputes. Among other things, the public prosecutor's office objected to the cover design of issue 6/1986 (FREE INSTEAD OF BAVARIA), which featured the Great Coat of Arms of the Free State of Bavaria, with the coat of arms lions depicted wearing police helmets, carrying batons and pistols, and three dogs superimposed.

The December 1987 issue of Radi-Aktiv featured prominent figures responsible for press law, such as Robert Jungk, Armin Weiss, Jutta Ditfurth, Jens Scheer, Johannes Kempmann, and others. They expressed their solidarity with the magazine and their protest against the ongoing legal proceedings.

== See also ==
- Laka (Archiv): Archive containing the anti-nuclear magazines Atom (Zeitschrift), Atom Express, Atommüll, Atommüllzeitung, Gorleben Aktuell, Nux integra
