= Wackersdorf reprocessing plant =

Unfinished nuclear reprocessing plant in Germany

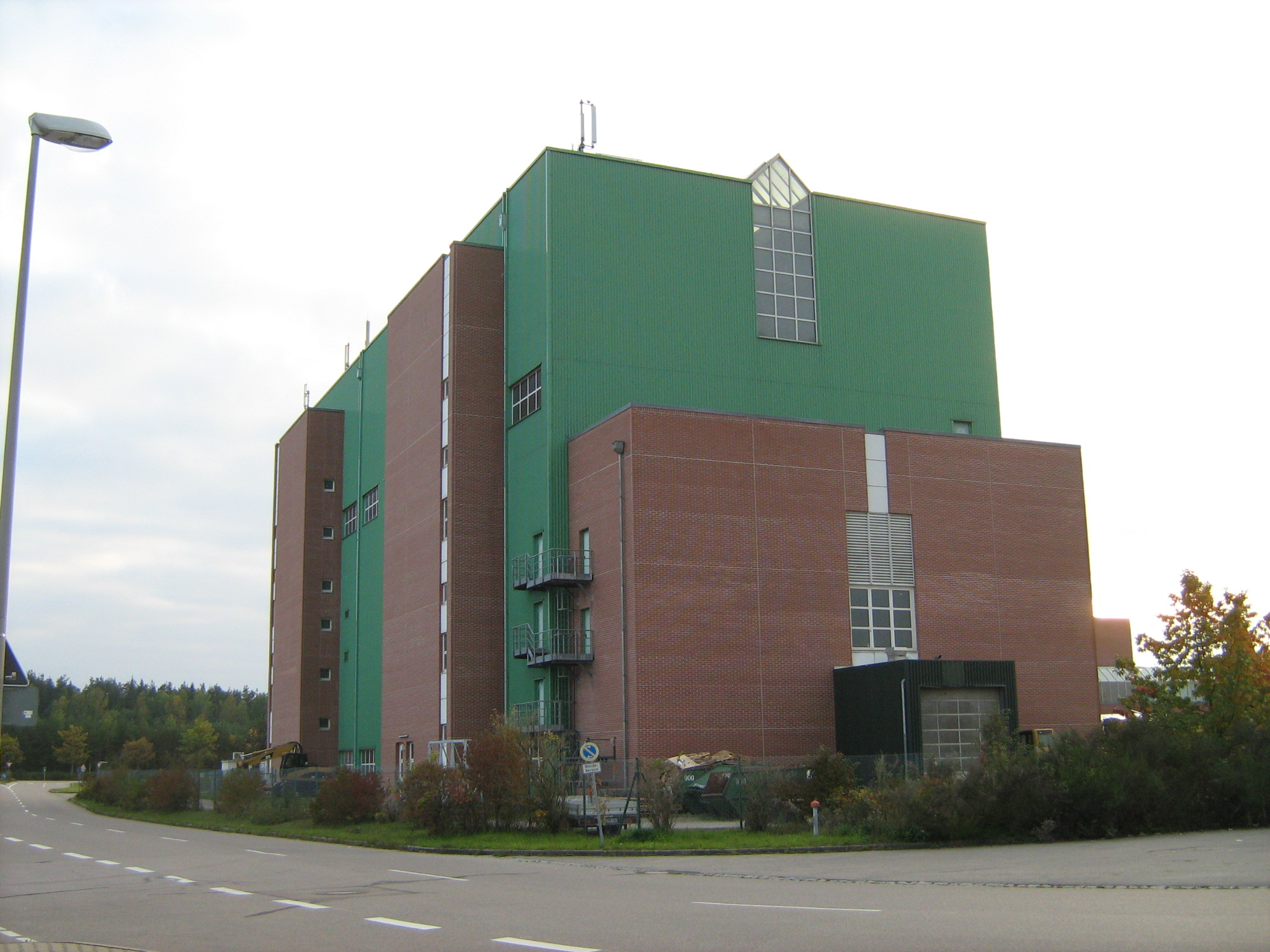
- WAA module test bench (2014)
- Built: 1985 (start of construction)
- Location: Wackersdorf (Bavaria, Germany)
- Coordinates: 49°19′14″N 12°13′57″E
- Industry: Nuclear reprocessing
- Defunct: 1989 (end of construction)

The Wackersdorf nuclear reprocessing plant (German: Wiederaufbereitungsanlage Wackersdorf (WAA)) was a planned reprocessing plant in Wackersdorf in Bavaria, Germany. Because of protests, the plant was never completed. Today it is an industrial site with no special features.

== Anti-WAA protest ==
In the early 1980s, plans to build a nuclear fuel reprocessing plant in the Bavarian town of Wackersdorf led to major protests. Even during the initial clearing work, demonstrators attempted to occupy the construction site, erecting the Free Republic of Wackerland shantytown in 1985. After 18 days, it was cleared in January 1986 in a large-scale police operation. The district administrator of Schwandorf (district), Hans Schuierer, also refused to sign the necessary permits for the plant's construction. To circumvent the district administrator's blockade, the Bavarian State Parliament passed the "Lex Schuierer". Many people and politicians from Austria also demonstrated against the construction of the nuclear facility in Bavaria. Following entry bans and border blockades, the WAA conflict between Bavaria and Austria escalated.

In 1986, peaceful protests as well as heavy confrontations between West German police armed with stun grenades, rubber bullets, water cannons, CS gas and CN-gas and demonstrators of which some were armed with slingshots, crowbars and Molotov cocktails took place at multiple occasions at the site of a nuclear reprocessing plant in Wackersdorf. The plans for the plant were abandoned in 1989. It is still unclear whether protests, plant economics, or the death of the Minister-President of the state of Bavaria, Franz Josef Strauß, in 1988 led to the decision.

The Anti-WAAhnsinns Festivals were political rock concerts which took place in Germany in the 1980s. (The name is a pun on WAA and Wahnsinn = madness.) Their purpose was to support protests against a planned nuclear reprocessing plant in Wackersdorf. In 1986, the fifth festival marked the peak of the protest movement against the plant.

Anti-WAA Wackersdorf protests

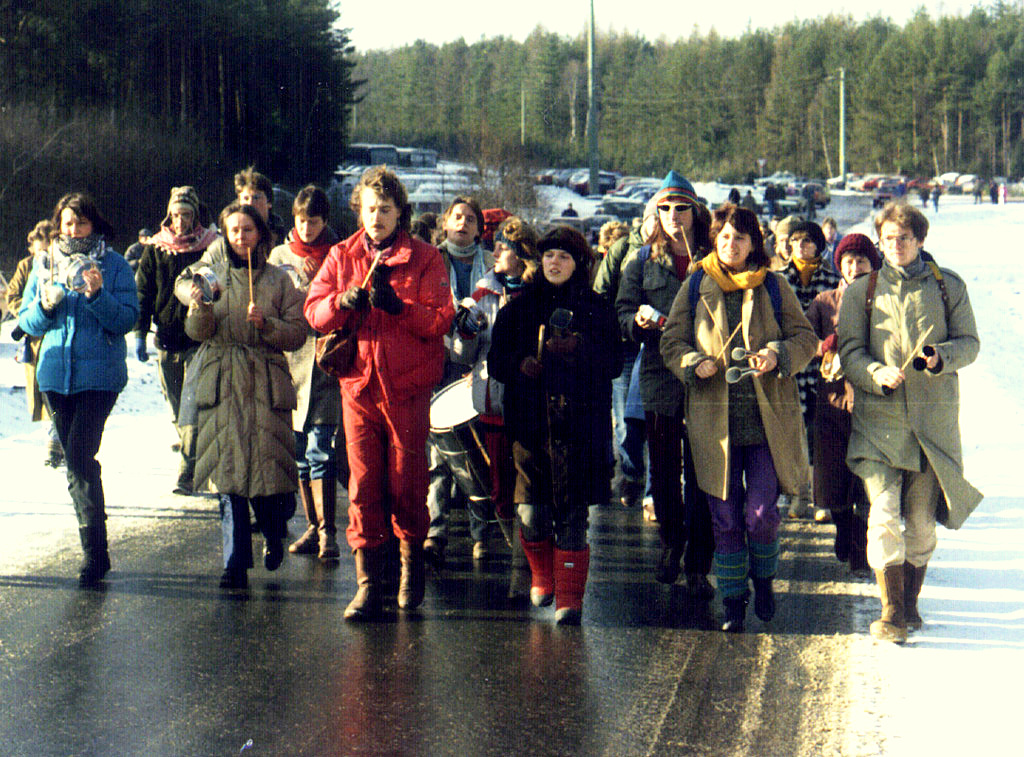
1986

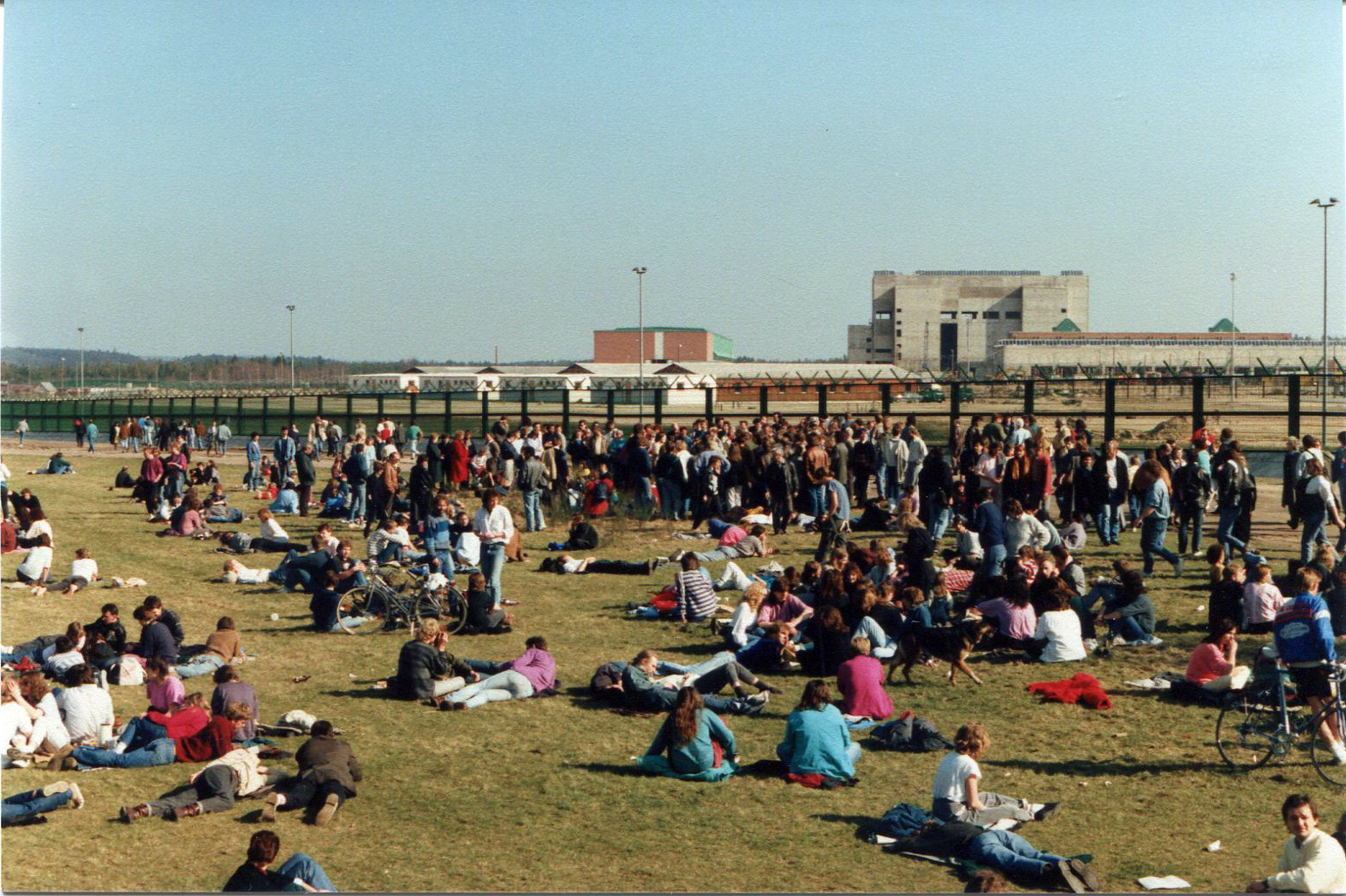
2 February 1989

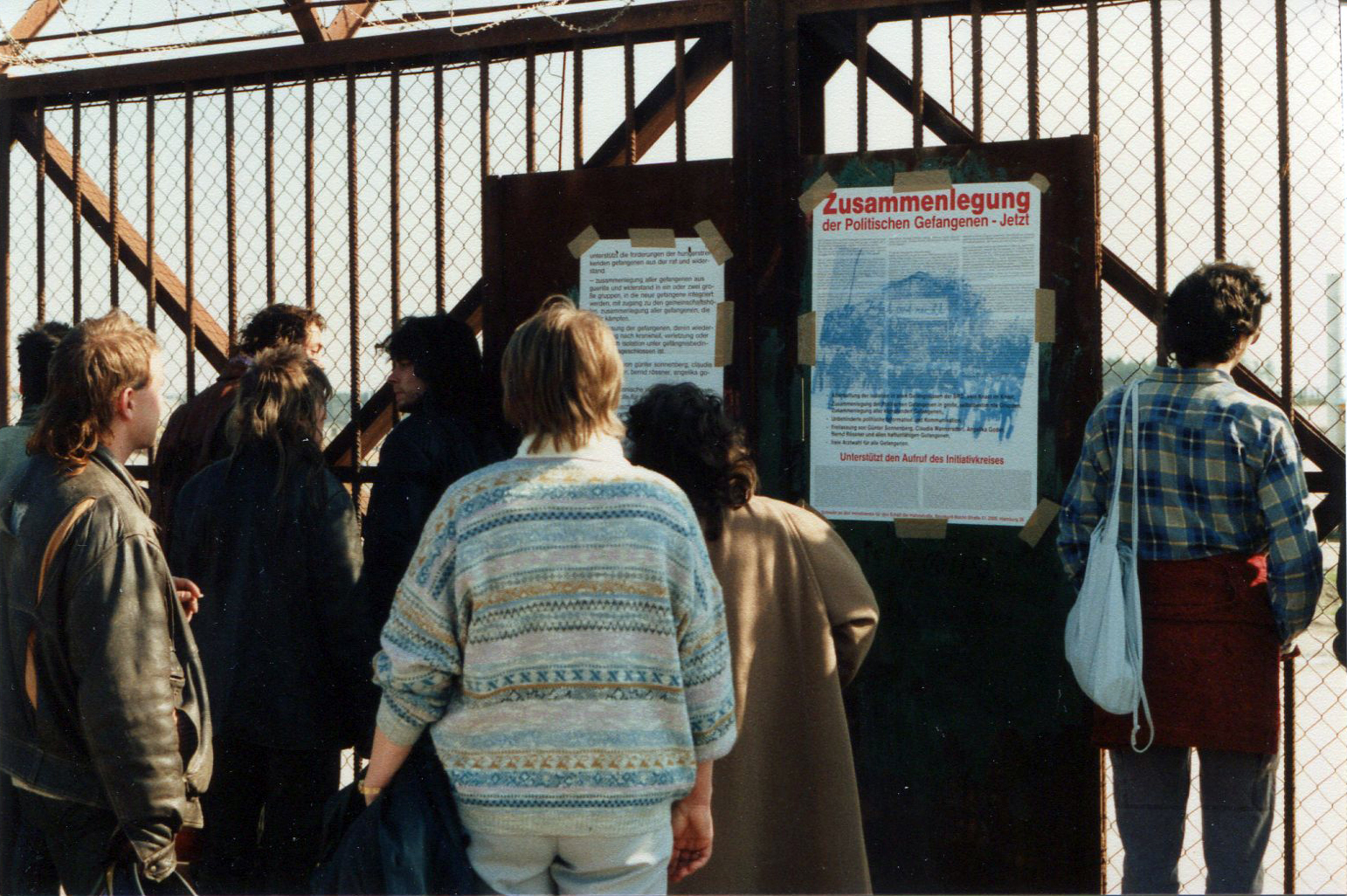
2 February 1989

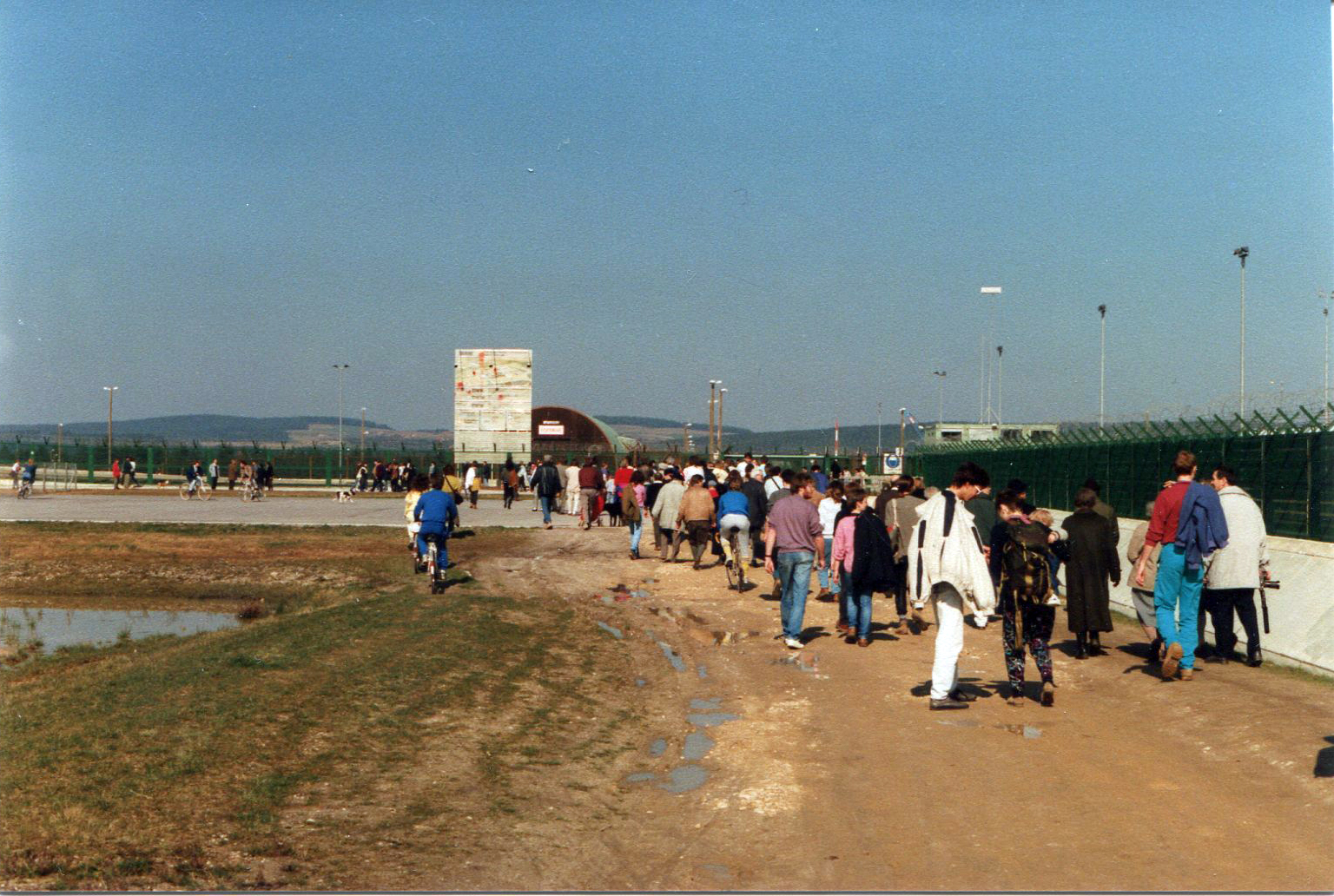
3 March 1989

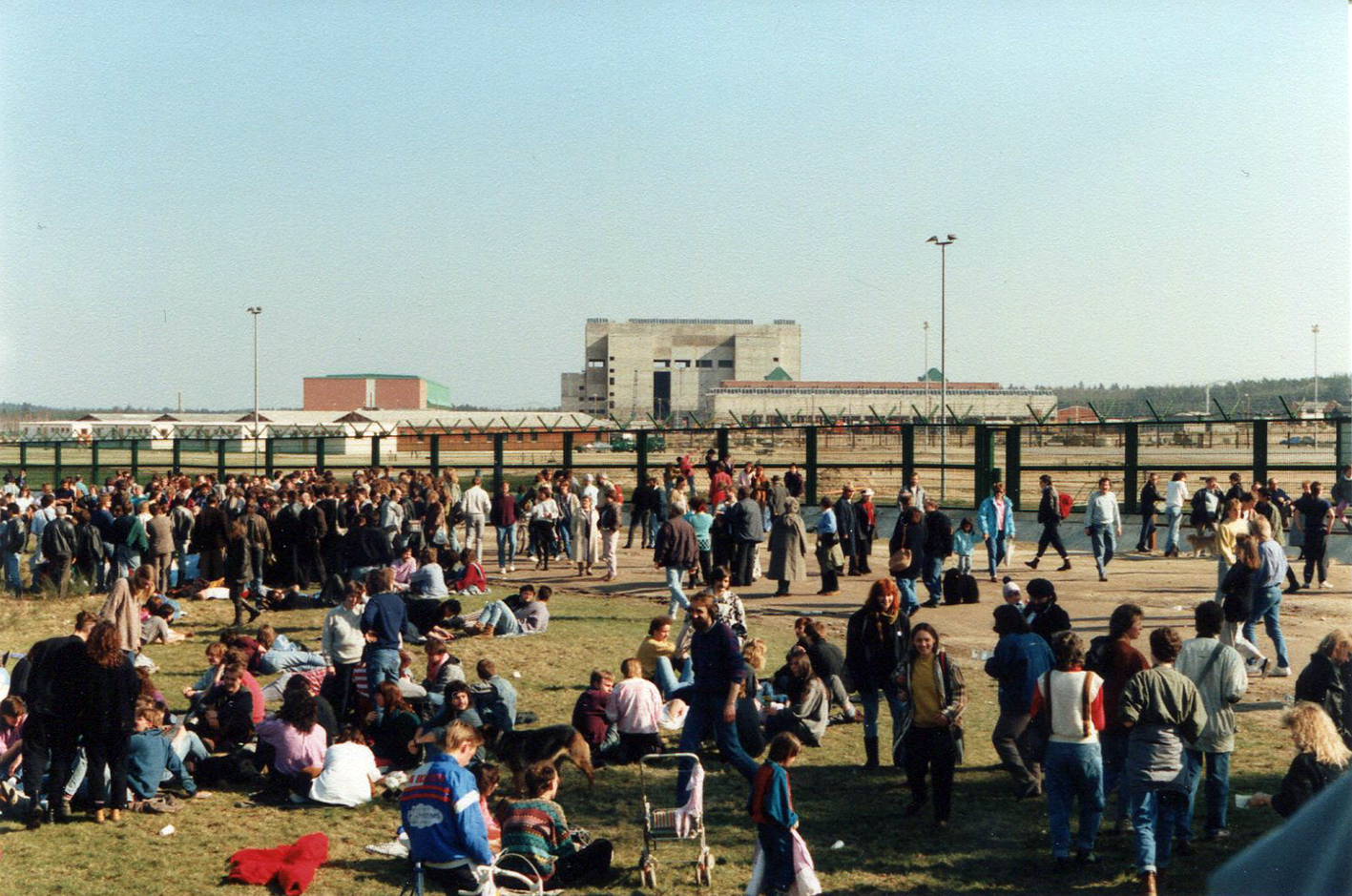
26 March 1989

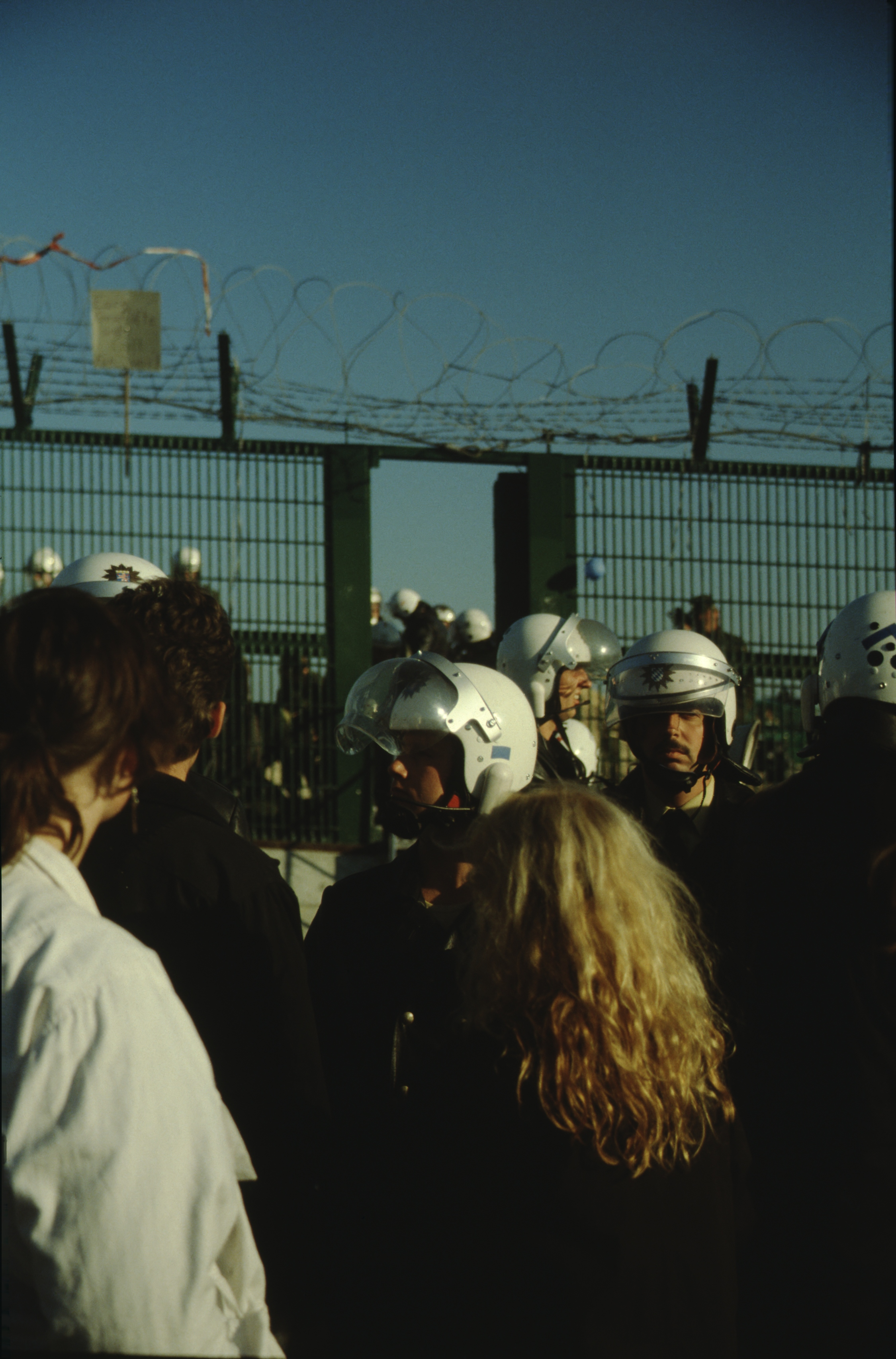
1986-1988

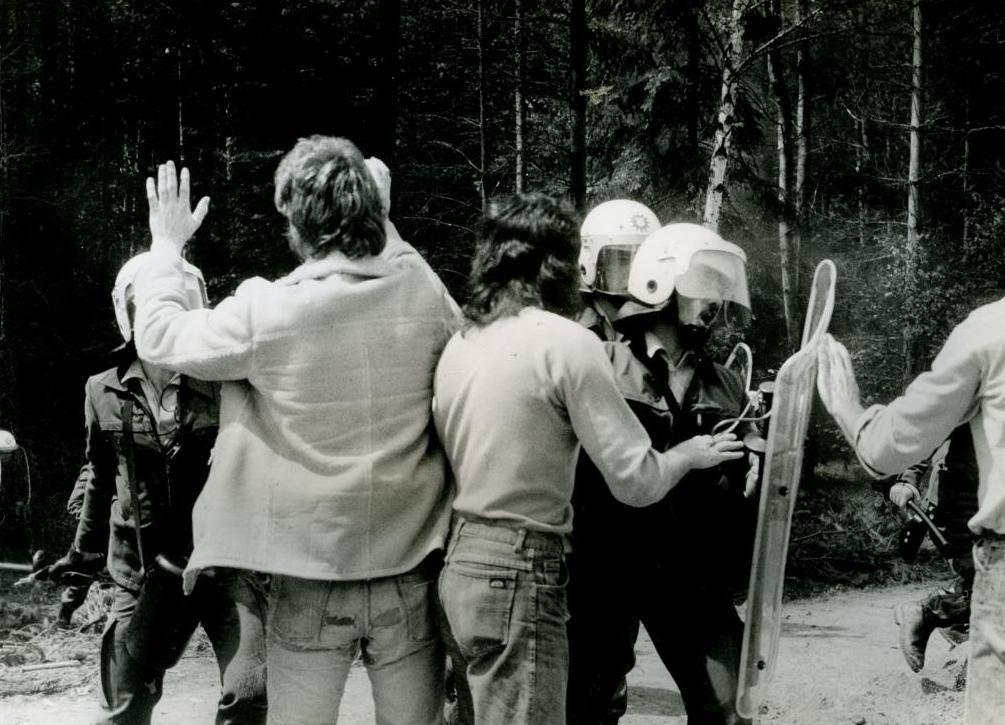
1980s

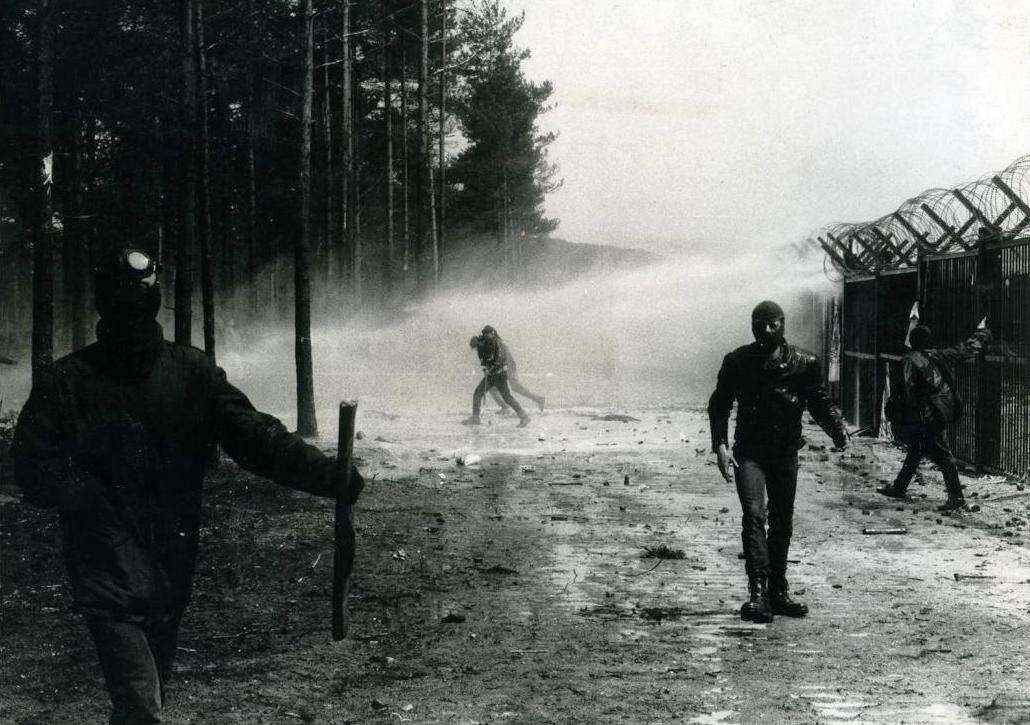
1980s

== Information panels of the Schwandorf district ==
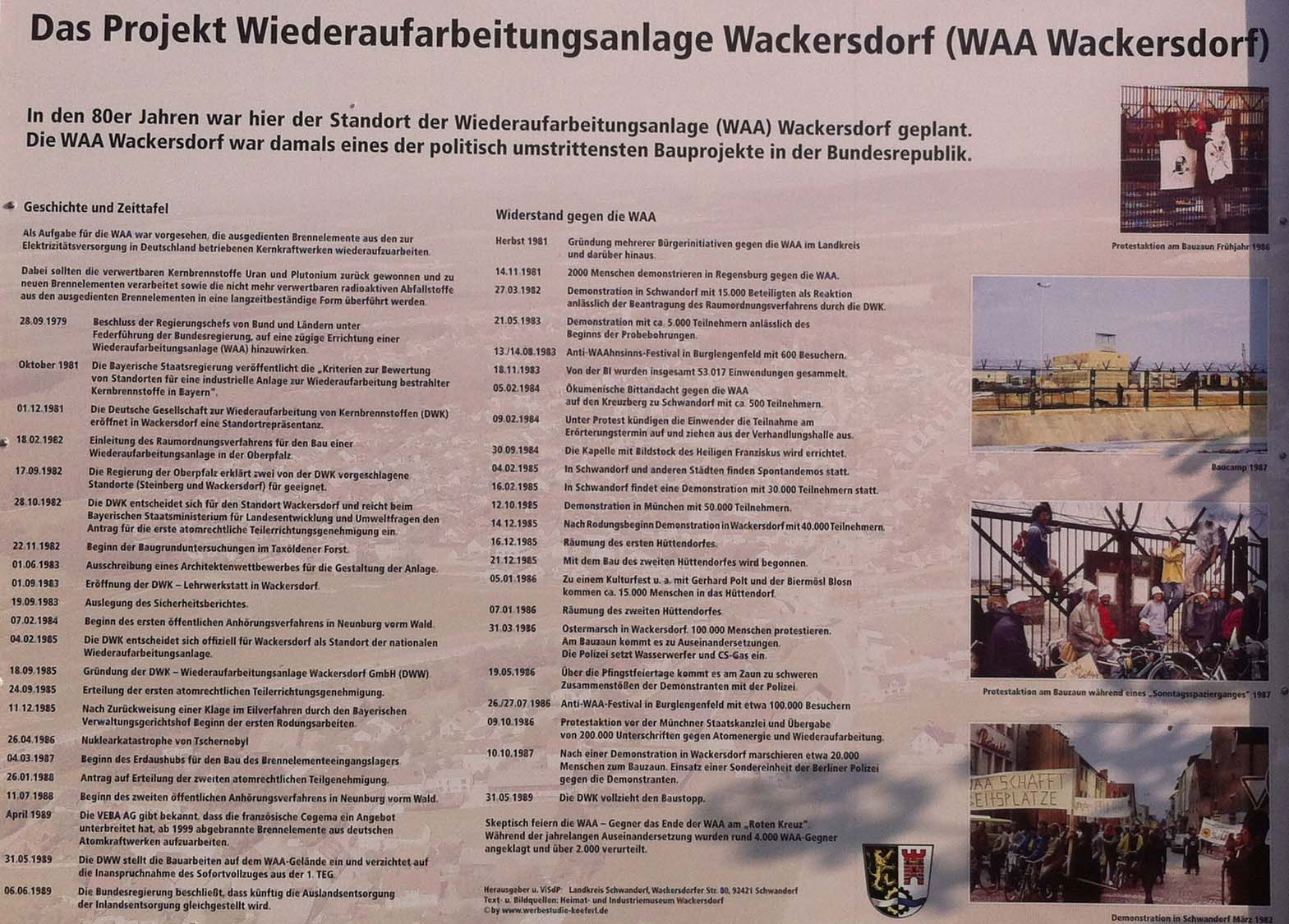
Memorial plaque

Today, two official commemorative plaques of the Schwandorf district commemorate the construction of and the resistance against the Wackersdorf reprocessing plant. In 2016, a commemorative plaque was unveiled at the Franziskus-Marterl, documenting the construction progress and the development of the resistance against the planned reprocessing plant up to the abandonment of the project. A similar information panel is also located on the former WAA site in front of the BMW plant.

Inscription:

The Wackersdorf reprocessing plant Project (WAA Wackersdorf)

In the 1980s, this was the planned location for the Wackersdorf Reprocessing Plant (WAA). At the time, the WAA Wackersdorf was one of the most politically controversial construction projects in West Germany.

History and Timeline

The WAA's task was to reprocess spent fuel elements from the nuclear power plants used to supply electricity in Germany.

This involved recovering the usable nuclear fuels uranium and plutonium and processing them into new fuel elements, as well as converting the non-usable radioactive waste from the spent fuel elements into a long-term stable form.

September 28, 1979

Decision by the heads of government of the federal and state governments, under the leadership of the Federal Government of Germany, to work towards the rapid construction of a reprocessing plant.

October 1981

The Bavarian State Government publishes the "Criteria for Evaluating Sites for an Industrial Plant for the Reprocessing of Spent Radioactive Fuel in Bavaria."

December 1, 1981

The German Society for the Reprocessing of Nuclear Fuels (DWK) opens a site office in Wackersdorf.

February 18, 1982

Initiation of the regional planning procedure for the construction of a reprocessing plant in the Upper Palatinate.

September 17, 1982

The Upper Palatinate government declares two sites proposed by the DWK (Steinberg and Wackersdorf) suitable.

October 28, 1982

DWK selects Wackersdorf as the site and submits the application for the first partial construction permit under nuclear law to the Bavarian State Ministry for Regional Development and Environmental Affairs.

November 22, 1982

Soil investigations begin in the Taxöldern Forest.

June 1, 1983

An architectural competition for the plant's design is announced.

September 1, 1983

The DWK training workshop opens in Wackersdorf.

September 19, 1983

The safety report is made available for public review.

February 7, 1984

The first public hearing begins in Neunburg vorm Wald.

February 4, 1985

DWK officially selects Wackersdorf as the site for the national reprocessing plant.

September 18, 1985

Establishment of DWK-Wackersdorf Reprocessing Plant GmbH (DWW).

September 24, 1985

Granting of the first partial construction permit under nuclear law.

December 11, 1985

After the Bavarian Administrative Court dismissed an expedited legal action, the first clearing work began.

April 26, 1986

Chernobyl nuclear disaster

March 4, 1987

Excavation begins for the construction of the spent fuel storage facility.

January 26, 1988

Application submitted for the second partial nuclear permit.

July 11, 1988

The second public hearing begins in Neunburg vorm Wald.

April 1989

VEBA AG announces that the French company Cogema has submitted a bid to reprocess spent fuel elements from German nuclear power plants starting in 1999.

May 31, 1989

DWW halts construction work on the WAA site and waives its right to immediate enforcement under the first partial permit (TEG). ... June 6, 1989

The Federal Government of Germany decides that in future, waste disposal abroad will be treated equally to domestic waste disposal.

Resistance against the WAA

Autumn 1981

Foundation of several citizens' initiatives against the WAA in the district and beyond.

November 14, 1981

2,000 people demonstrate against the WAA in Regensburg.

March 27, 1982

Demonstration in Schwandorf with 15,000 participants in response to DWK's application for the regional planning procedure.

May 21, 1983

Demonstration with approximately 5,000 participants to mark the start of exploratory drilling.

August 13/14, 1983

Anti-WAAhnsinns-Festival Festival in Burglengenfeld with 600 attendees.

November 18, 1983

The citizens' initiative collected a total of 53,017 objections.

February 5, 1984

Ecumenical prayer service against the WAA on Kreuzberg hill (Kreuzberg Church, Schwandorf) in Schwandorf with approximately 500 participants.

February 9, 1984

Under protest, the objectors withdraw from the hearing and leave the courtroom.

September 30, 1984

The chapel with the wayside shrine (Franziskus-Marterl) of Saint Francis is erected.

February 4, 1985

Spontaneous demonstrations take place in Schwandorf and other cities.

February 16, 1985

A demonstration with 30,000 participants takes place in Schwandorf.

October 12, 1985

Demonstration in Munich with 50,000 participants.

December 14, 1985

After the start of clearing work, a demonstration with 40,000 participants takes place in Wackersdorf.

December 16, 1985

Eviction of the first hut village.

December 21, 1985

Construction of the second hut village (Free Republic of Wackerland) begins.

January 5, 1986

Approximately 15,000 people attend a cultural festival in the hut village, featuring Gerhard Polt and the Biermösl Blosn, among others.

January 7, 1986

Eviction of the second hut village (Free Republic of Wackerland)

March 31, 1986

Easter march in Wackersdorf. 100,000 people protest. Clashes break out at the construction fence. Police use water cannons and CS gas.

May 19, 1986

Over the Pentecost holidays, there are serious clashes between demonstrators and police at the fence.

July 26/27, 1986

Fifth Anti-WAAhnsinns-Festival in Burglengenfeld with approximately 100,000 attendees.

October 9, 1986

Protest in front of the Bavarian State Chancellery in Munich and handover of 200,000 signatures against nuclear energy and reprocessing.

October 10, 1987

Following a demonstration in Wackersdorf, approximately 20,000 people march to the construction fence. A special unit of the Berlin police is deployed against the demonstrators.

May 31, 1989

DWK halts construction.

Opponents of the WAA (nuclear reprocessing plant) celebrate the project's end at the "Red Cross" site with skepticism.

During the years-long conflict, around 4,000 WAA opponents were charged and over 2,000 convicted.

== Protest monuments ==
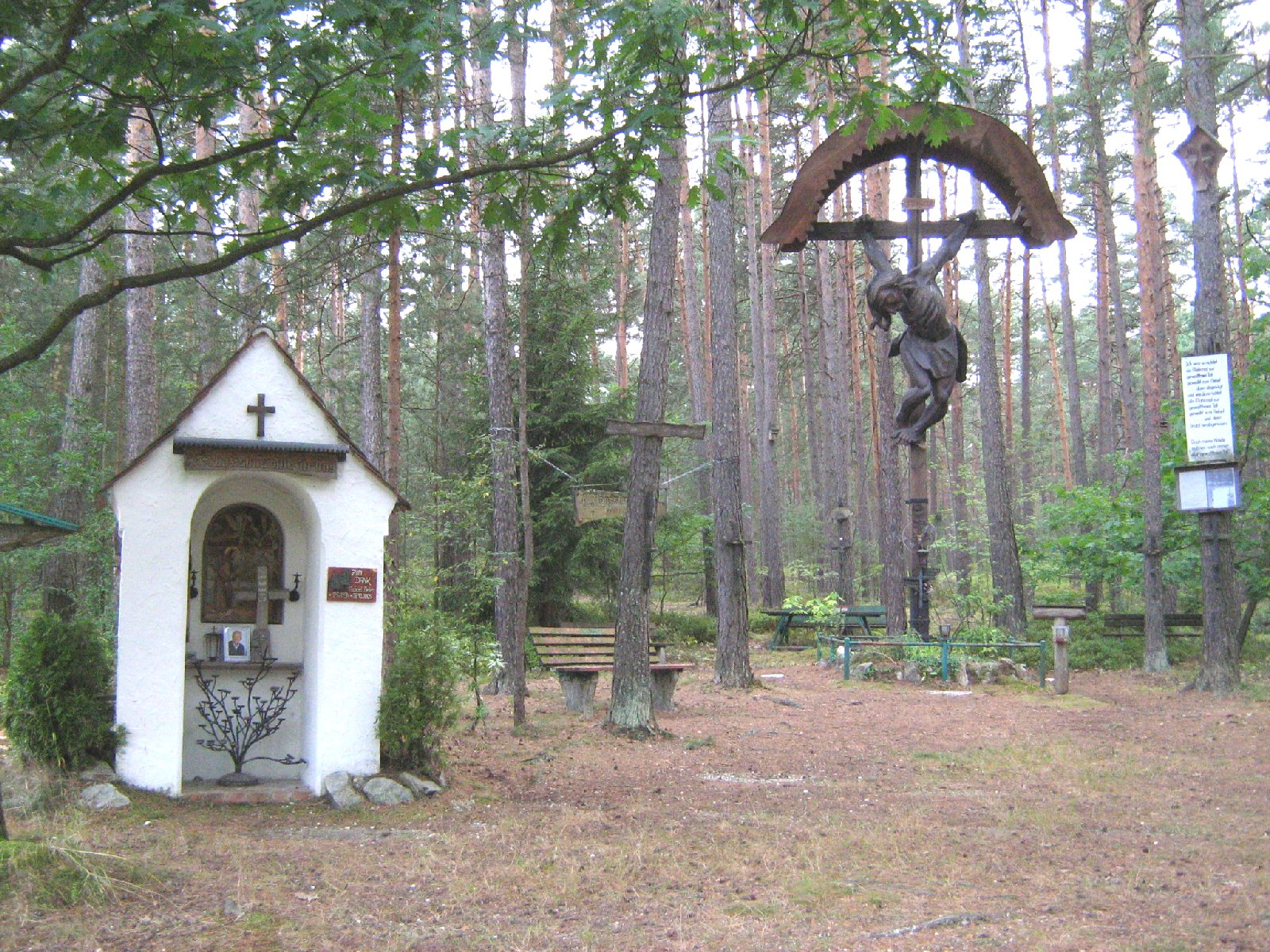
Franziskus-Marterl with the Cross of Wackersdorf

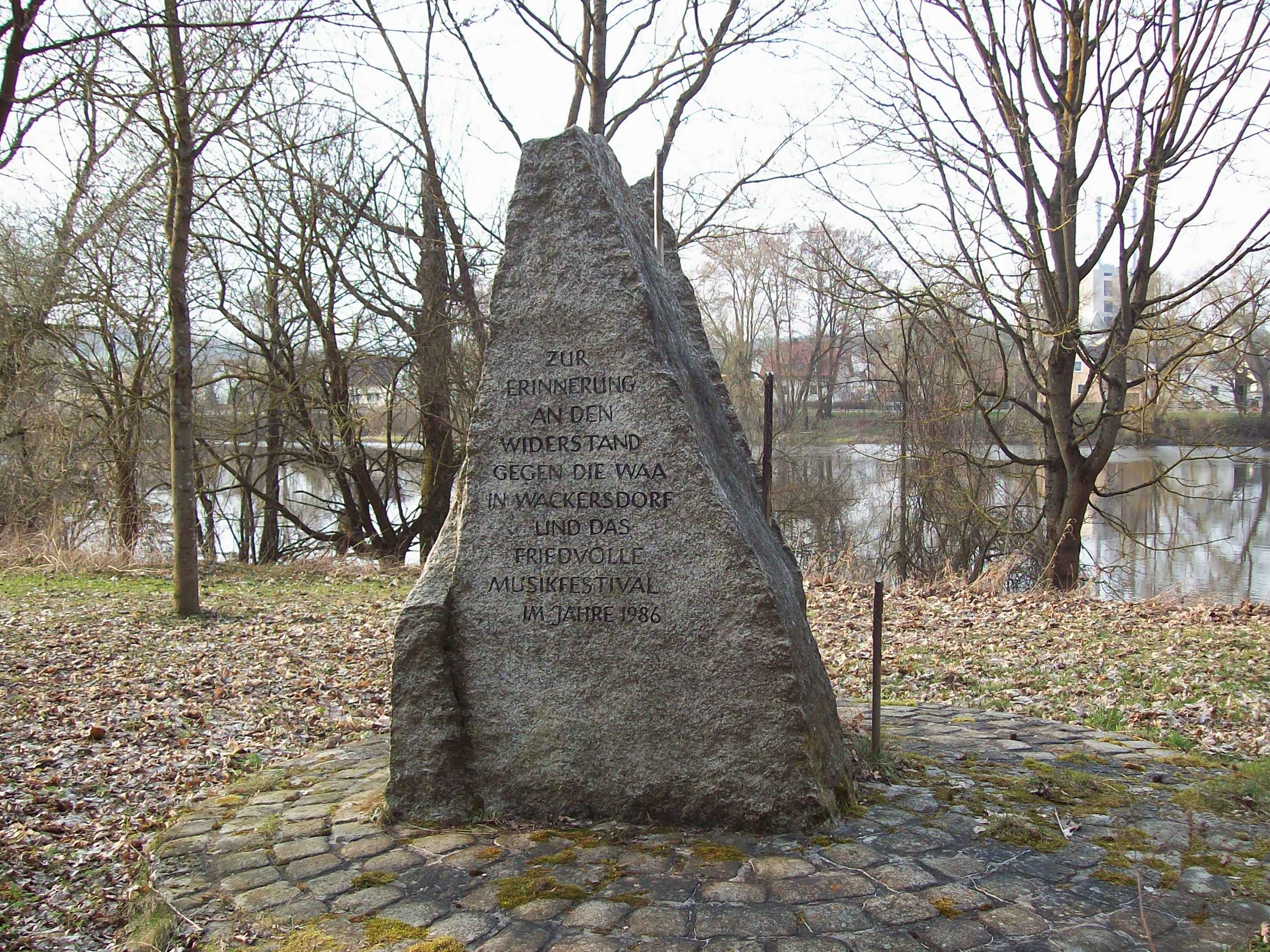
Anti-WAAhnsinns-Festival memorial stone in Burglengenfeld

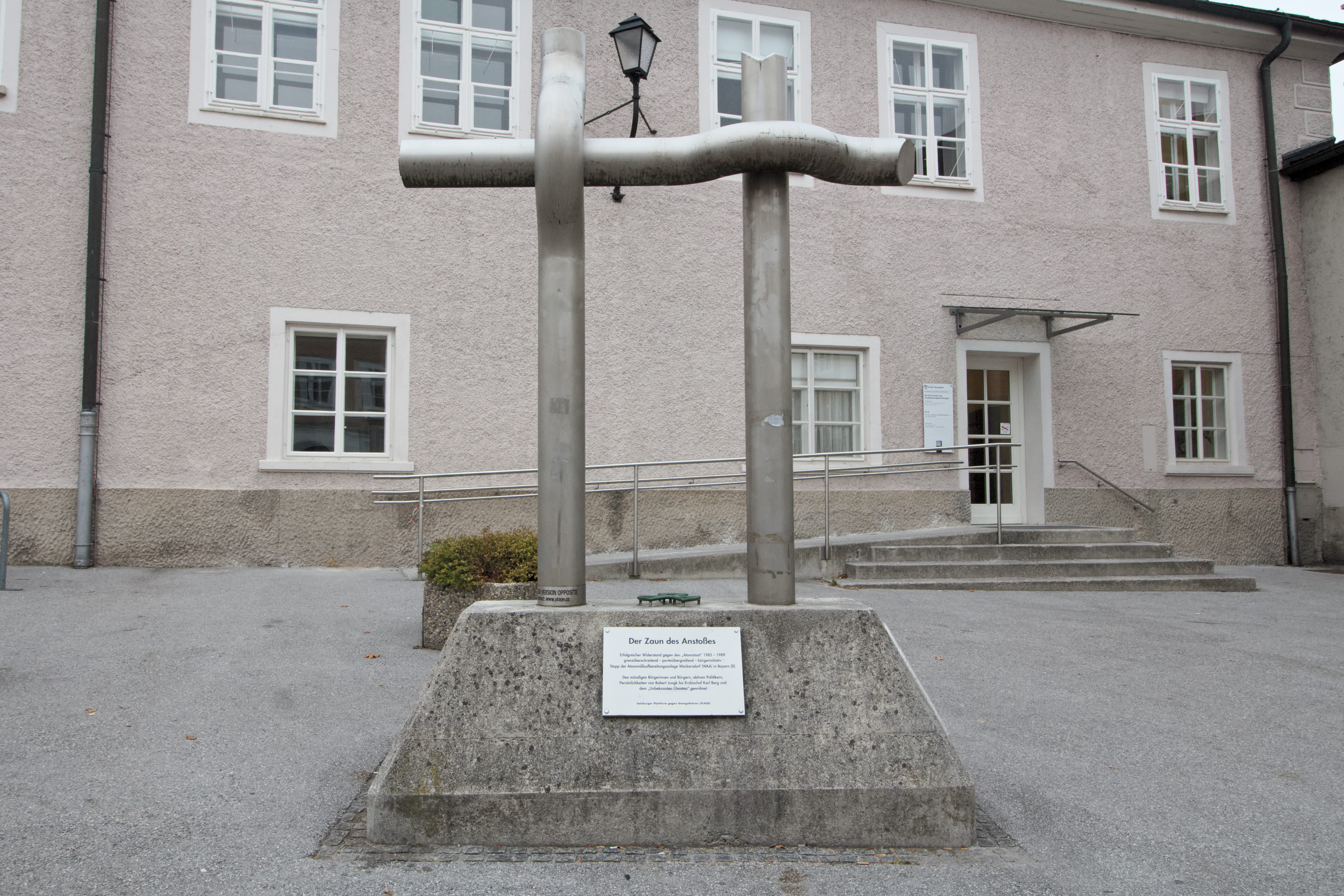
Wackersdorf Memorial in Salzburg

To this day, there are still some monuments to the WAA resistance against the plant (see List of monuments related to the Wackersdorf reprocessing plant):

- Franziskus-Marterl (St. Francis shrine/chapel) with the Cross of Wackersdorf near the WAA. At the chapel-shrine in the mid-1980s, WAA opponents met every Sunday at 14:00 for an ecumenical prayer and then moved into the area or to the hoarding. This is the same place where today the "Marterlgemeinde" meet four times a year to a prayer: at the Chernobyl- and Hiroshima-commemoration in memory of the shrine's saint Francis of Assisi on 3 October and on Christmas Eve.
- Anti-WAAhnsinns Festival memorial stone at Lanzenanger in Burglengenfeld
- Anti-WAA ex-voto in the Kreuzberg Church at Kreuzberg in Schwandorf
- WAA resistance memorial in front of the lake facilities, Bregenz Festspielhaus (Austria)
- Wackersdorf Memorial (Salzburg) in Salzburg (Austria)

== Documentary films ==
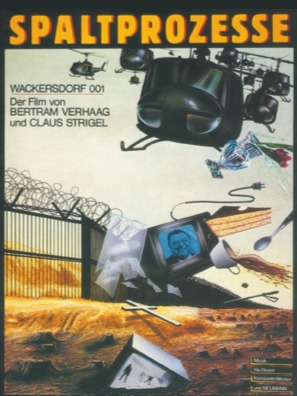
Spaltprozesse (film)

Some German documentaries about WAA were filmed.

- 1986: WAAhnsinn – Der Wackersdorf-Film (documentary film)
- 1986: WAA Wackersdorf: Strahlende Zukunft für die Oberpfalz (WAA Wackersdorf: A Radiant Future for the Upper Palatinate: Monitor-documentary by Gabriele Krone-Schmalz, Ekkehard Sieker, Helge Cramer)
- 1986: 18 Tage freies Wackerland (The 18 Days of the Free Wacker Land: Medienwerkstatt Franken, Bibliothek des Widerstands Band 19, BellaStoria Film)
- 1986: WAA-Schlachten (WAA Battles: Medienwerkstatt Franken, Bibliothek des Widerstands Band 19, BellaStoria Film)
- 1987: Spaltprozesse (Fission processes - Wackersdorf 001: documentary film)
- 1988: Zaunkämpfe (Fighting at the Fence: Medienwerkstatt Franken 1988, BellaStoria Film)
- 1989: Restrisiko (Dokumentarfilm) (The Remaining Risk or the Arrogance of Power: documentary film)
- 1991: Das achte Gebot (1991) (The Eighth Commandment: documentary film against nuclear energy)
- 1996: Wackersdorf - ein Mythos? Was ist aus den WAA-Kämpfern von einst geworden? (Wackersdorf - a myth? What happened to the former WAA fighters? Medienwerkstatt Franken)
- 2006: Schreckgespenst WAA – Widerstand in Wackersdorf (The WAA Heartburn: Resistance in Wackersdorf: Medienwerkstatt Franken, Bibliothek des Widerstands Band 19, BellaStoria Film)
- 2006: Halbwertszeiten (Half-lifes: documentary film)
- 2009: Albtraum Atommüll (The Nightmare of Nuclear Waste: ARTE-documentary film about the fate of nuclear waste and about the dangers of nuclear energy)
- 2010: Der Fahrradspeichenfabrikkomplex (The Complex of the Bicycle Spoke Factory: Hörbuch-Feature 2010 von Angela Kreuz und Dieter Lohr)
- 2011: Kirche unterstützt Mahnwache am Wackersdorfdenkmal (The Church supports the picket at the Wackersdorf memorial, Salzburger Nachrichten)
- 2012: Lieber heute aktiv als morgen radioaktiv (Better active today than radioactive tomorrow: contribution by Lars Friedrich in the TV magazine ttt – titel, thesen, temperamente)
- 2017: Kampf gegen die WAA Wackersdorf (Fight against the WAA Wackersdorf), BR24
- 2019: Ende der WAA (1989) - Pfarrer Salzl und Hans Schuierer feiern das WAA-Aus am Bauzaun (End of the WAA 1989 - catholic priest Richard Salzl and District Administrator Hans Schuierer celebrate the WAA's demise at the construction fence), BR24

Movies:

- 2018: Wackersdorf (film): In 2018, Oliver Haffner directed the film Wackersdorf starring Johannes Zeiler as Hans Schuierer, the fictional district administrator of Schwandorf who fights against the Wackersdorf reprocessing plant (WAA) in Bavaria.

== See also ==
- WAA conflict between Bavaria and Austria
- Anti-nuclear movement in Germany

== Literature ==
- Astrid Mignon Kirchhof, Helmuth Trischler: Civil society interaction – the Wackersdorf example in: ibid Pathways into and out of Nuclear Power in Western Europe Austria, Denmark, Federal Republic of Germany, Italy, and Sweden. Deutsches Museum Studies 4, 2020 pp.148-149, ISBN 978-3-940396-92-1
- Hans Schuierer: When resistance becomes a Duty. - An unimaginable ordeal that became an important anti-nuclear milestone. speech 2014, beyondnuclearinternational 2019
- Radi Aktiv (magazine)
