= Yellow Letters =

2026 film by İlker Çatak

- German theatrical poster
- German: Gelbe Briefe
- Directed by: İlker Çatak
- Written by: İlker Çatak; Ayda Çatak; Enis Köstepen
- Produced by: Ingo Fliess
- Starring: Özgü Namal; Tansu Biçer; Leyla Smyrna Cabas; İpek Bilgin
- Cinematography: Judith Kaufmann
- Edited by: Gesa Jäger
- Music by: Marvin Miller
- Production companies: Arte; Haut et Court; Liman Film; ZDF; if… Productions
- Distributed by: Alamode Film (Germany)
- Release dates: 13 February 2026 (Berlinale); 5 March 2026 (Germany)
- Running time: 127 minutes
- Countries: Germany; Turkey; France
- Language: Turkish

Yellow Letters (German: Gelbe Briefe) is a 2026 political drama film directed by İlker Çatak, who co-wrote the screenplay with Ayda Çatak and Enis Köstepen. It follows Derya (Özgü Namal) and Aziz (Tansu Biçer), a couple of Turkish theater artists who lose their jobs due to political persecution in Turkey.

The film had its world premiere at the main competition of the 76th Berlin International Film Festival on 13 February 2026, where it won the Golden Bear. It was theatrically released in Germany by Alamode Film on 5 March.

== Premise ==
The marriage of an artist couple begins to unravel when they lose their jobs shortly after their play's premiere.

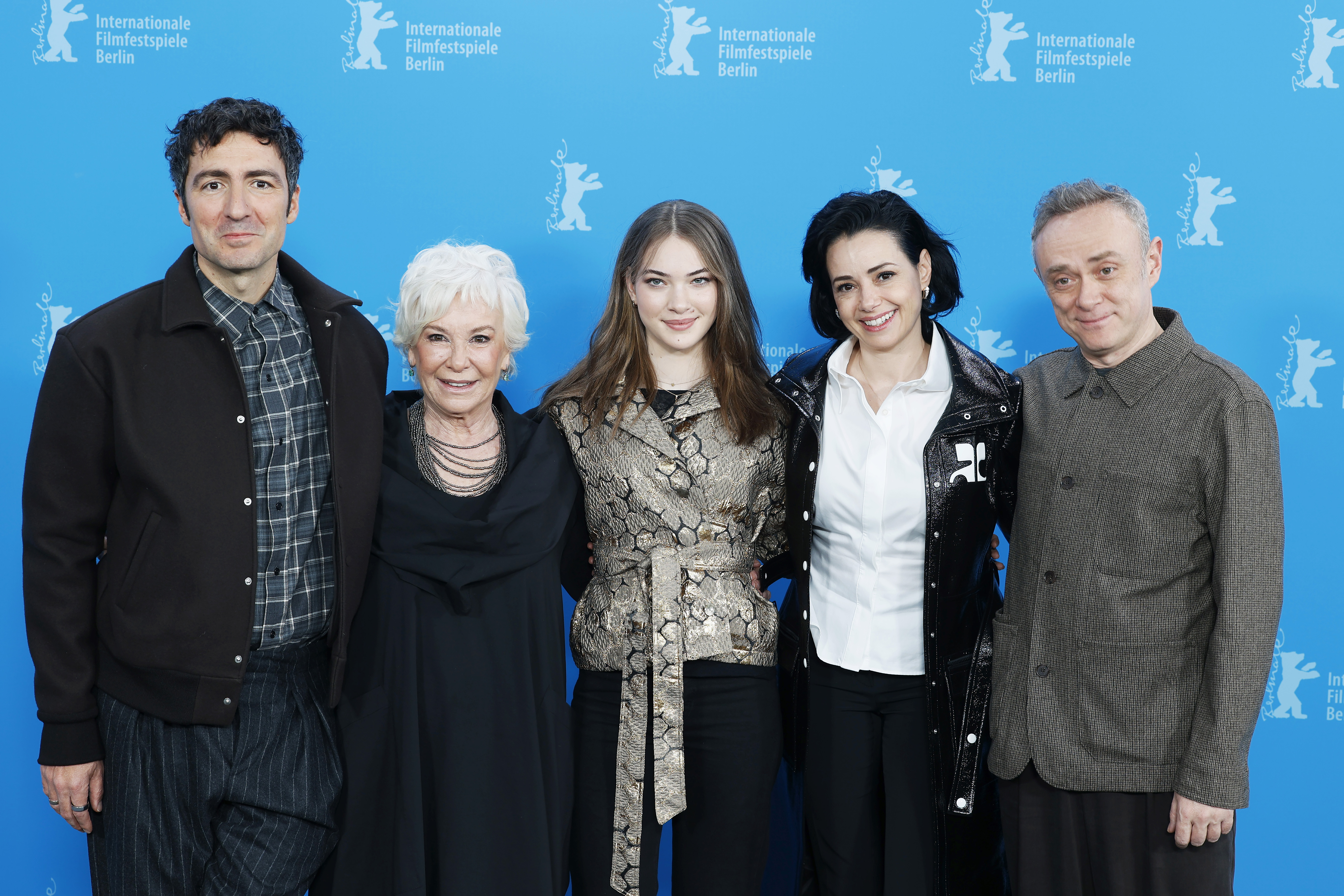
İlker Çatak, İpek Bilgin, Leyla Smyrna Cabas, Özgü Namal and Tansu Biçer at the 76th Berlin International Film Festival

== Cast ==
- Özgü Namal as Derya Tufan
- Tansu Biçer as Aziz Tufan
- Leyla Smyrna Cabas as Ezgi Tufan
- İpek Bilgin as Güngör Tufan
- Aydın Işık as Salih
- Aziz Çapkurt as Baran
- Yusuf Akgün as Fikret
- Uygar Tamer as Kadriye
- Jale Arıkan as Kübra
- Seda Türkmen as Sema
- Emre Bakar as Ismail Karacabaş
- Elit İşcan as Cemre
- Sultan Ulutaş Alopé as Rojda
- Emine Meyrem as Gülin
- İpek Seyalıoğlu as Zeynep

== Production ==
=== Development ===
An international co-production of Germany, France, and Turkey. In 2021, the project received a €10,000 production grant by the German-Turkish Co-Production Development Fund. It participated at the Berlinale Co-Production Market in February 2022. In November 2022, the project was awarded €65,000 grant from the MOIN Filmförderung. The project received €368,000 production grant from Eurimages in November 2023.

=== Filming ===
Principal photography took place in Hamburg and Berlin, standing in for Ankara and Istanbul, and wrapped in July 2024. It was also shot at the Berliner Ensemble Main Auditorium, with a scene involving about 250 extras.

== Release ==
Yellow Letters had its world premiere at the Main Competition section of the 76th Berlin International Film Festival in February 2026. In February 2024, Be For Films acquired the film's international sales.

The film was released theatrically in Germany by Alamode Film on 5 March 2026.

The film was also part of Horizons section of the 60th Karlovy Vary International Film Festival, where it was screened from 3 July to 7 July 2026. For its Spanish premiere, it was selected in the 'Official Section' slate of the 71st Valladolid International Film Festival.

== Reception ==
=== Critical response ===
On review aggregator website Rotten Tomatoes, the film holds an approval rating of 86% based on 21 reviews, with an average rating of 6.7/10. On Metacritic, the film has a weighted average score of 66 out of 100, based on 9 critics, indicating "generally favorable reviews".

=== Accolades ===
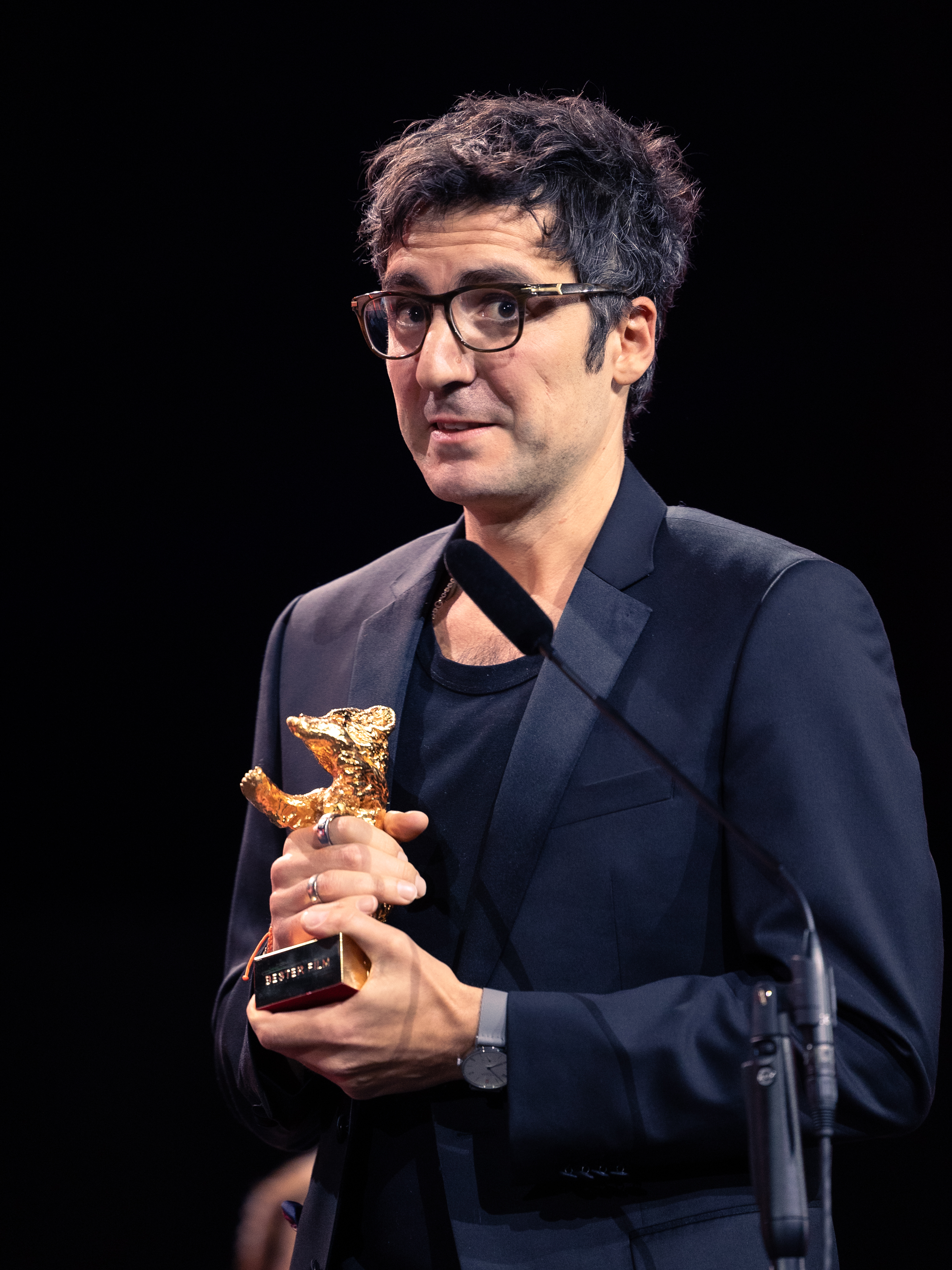
Golden Bear winner: İlker Çatak

| Award | Date of ceremony | Category | Recipient | Result | Ref. |
|---|---|---|---|---|---|
| Berlin International Film Festival | 22 February 2026 | Golden Bear | Yellow Letters | Won | |
| Berlin International Film Festival | 22 February 2026 | Prize of the Guild of German Arthouse Cinemas | Yellow Letters | Won | |
| German Film Awards | 29 May 2026 | Best Fiction Film | | Nominated | |
| German Film Awards | 29 May 2026 | Best Director | Ilker Çatak | Nominated | |
| German Film Awards | 29 May 2026 | Best Screenplay | Ilker Çatak; Ayda Meryem Çatak; Enis Köstepen | Nominated | |
| German Film Awards | 29 May 2026 | Best Actress | Özgü Namal | Nominated | |
| German Film Awards | 29 May 2026 | Best Actor | Tansu Biçer | Nominated | |
| German Film Awards | 29 May 2026 | Best Cinematography | Judith Kaufmann | Nominated | |
| German Film Awards | 29 May 2026 | Best Editing | Gesa Jäger | Nominated | |
| German Film Awards | 29 May 2026 | Best Original Score | Marvin Miller | Won | |
| German Film Awards | 29 May 2026 | Best Production Design | Zazie Knepper | Nominated | |
