= İlker Çatak =

German film director

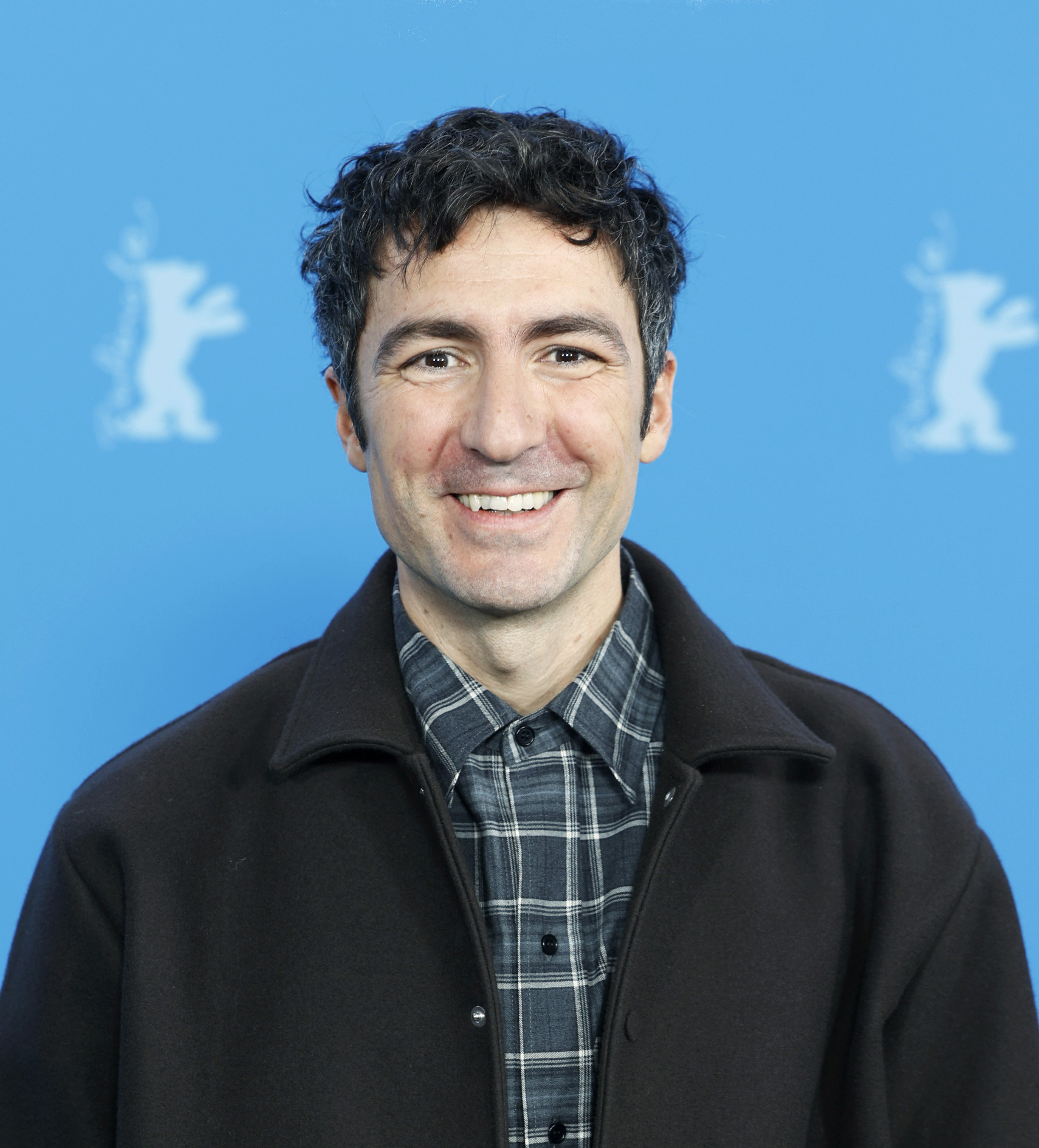
- Çatak in 2026
- Born: 1984 (age 41–42); Berlin, Germany
- Occupations: Film director; Screenwriter
- Years active: 2005 - present

İlker Çatak (born in 1984 in Berlin) is a German film director and screenwriter of Turkish origin. He is known for The Teachers' Lounge (2023), which received a nomination for the Academy Award for Best International Feature Film at the 96th Academy Awards, and for Yellow Letters (2026), which won the Golden Bear at the 76th Berlin International Film Festival on 13 February 2026.

== Career ==
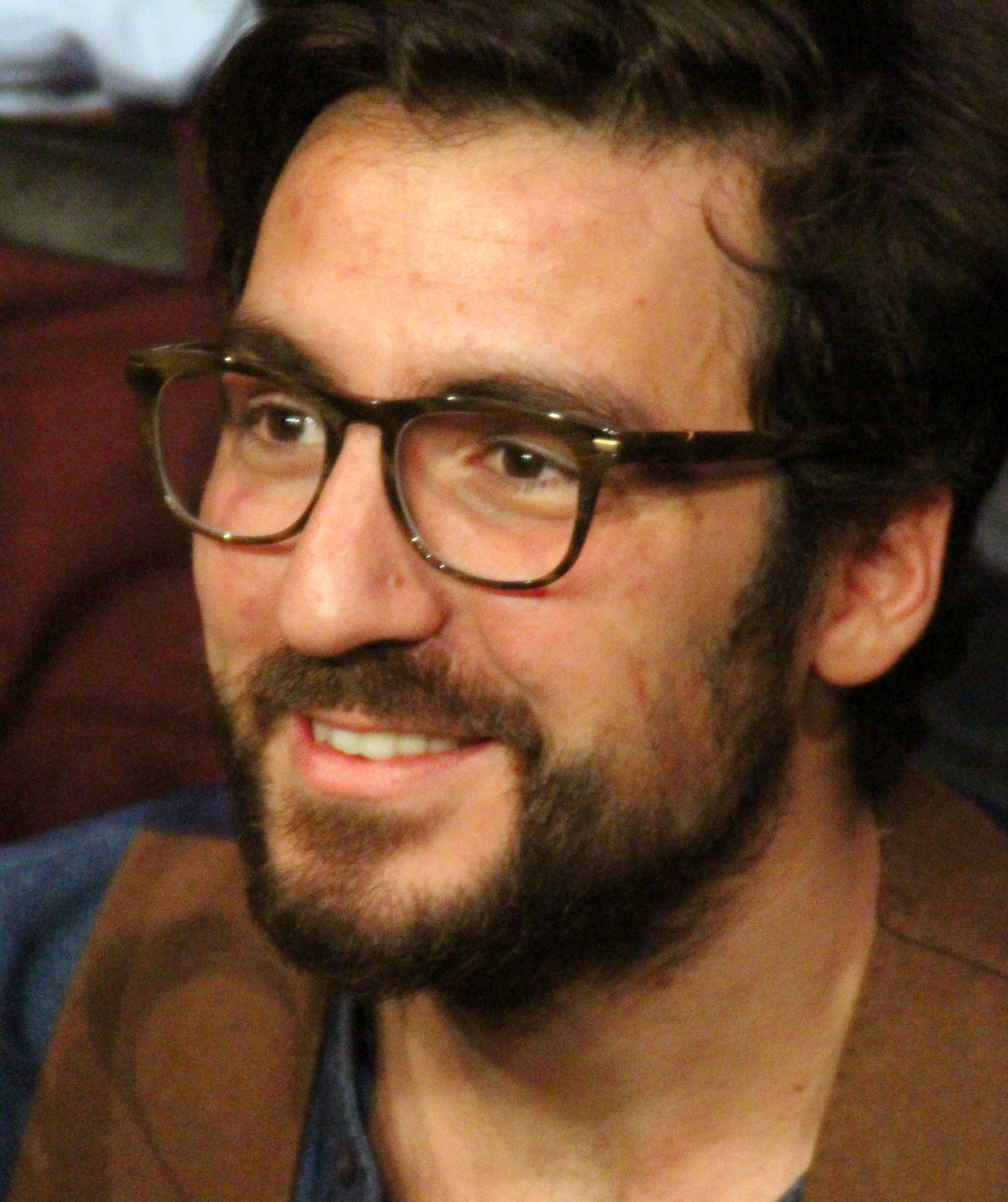
Çatak in 2015

İlker Çatak was born in Berlin in 1984 to Turkish immigrants. At the age of twelve, he moved to Istanbul, Turkey, and graduated there from the embassy school. He then returned to Germany and worked for German and international cinema productions. From 2005, he directed short films and commercials. In 2009, he graduated with a bachelor's degree in Film and Television Directing at the Dekra Medienhochschule Berlin. His short film When Namibia was a city... (Original: Namibya şehir iken..., co-directed by Johannes Duncker) premiered at the Hof International Film Festival in 2010. From 2012-2014, he studied Directing at the Hamburg Media School. The short film Where we are (German: Wo wir sind) was selected for the talent showcase Next Generation Short Tiger and a finalist for the 2014 Student Academy Awards. His graduation short Fidelity (Original: Sadakat) won the Foreign Film Gold Medal at the 2015 Student Academy Awards. Both films won the Best Short Film Award at the Filmfestival Max-Ophüls-Prize Saarbrücken in 2014 and 2015, among other awards. Çatak's feature directorial debut Once upon a time... Indianerland (German: Es war einmal Indianerland) was released in German cinemas in 2017. His next feature film I Was, I Am, I Will Be (German: Es gilt das gesprochene Wort, 2019) won the German Film Award (Bronze) in 2020 and was nominated for Best Director, Best Screenplay, Best Actress and Best Supporting Actor. Blurred Lines (German: Räuberhände, 2020) won the Bavarian Film Award for Best Young Actor in 2022.

In February 2023, his feature The Teachers' Lounge (German: Das Lehrerzimmer) premiered at the 73rd Berlin International Film Festival. The film won five German Film Awards including Best Film (Gold), Best Director, Best Screenplay, Best Actress and Best Editing. Çatak was also nominated for the European Film Award for Best Screenwriter for the film. The film screened at numerous international film festivals and was released theatrically in many countries. In 2024, The Teachers' Lounge was nominated for the Academy Award for Best International Feature Film.

In June 2024, Çatak was invited to become a member of the Academy of Motion Picture Arts and Sciences.

In 2026, his feature film Yellow Letters (German: Gelbe Briefe) had its world premiere at the main competition of the 76th Berlin International Film Festival, where it won the Golden Bear, the festival's main prize.

== Filmography ==
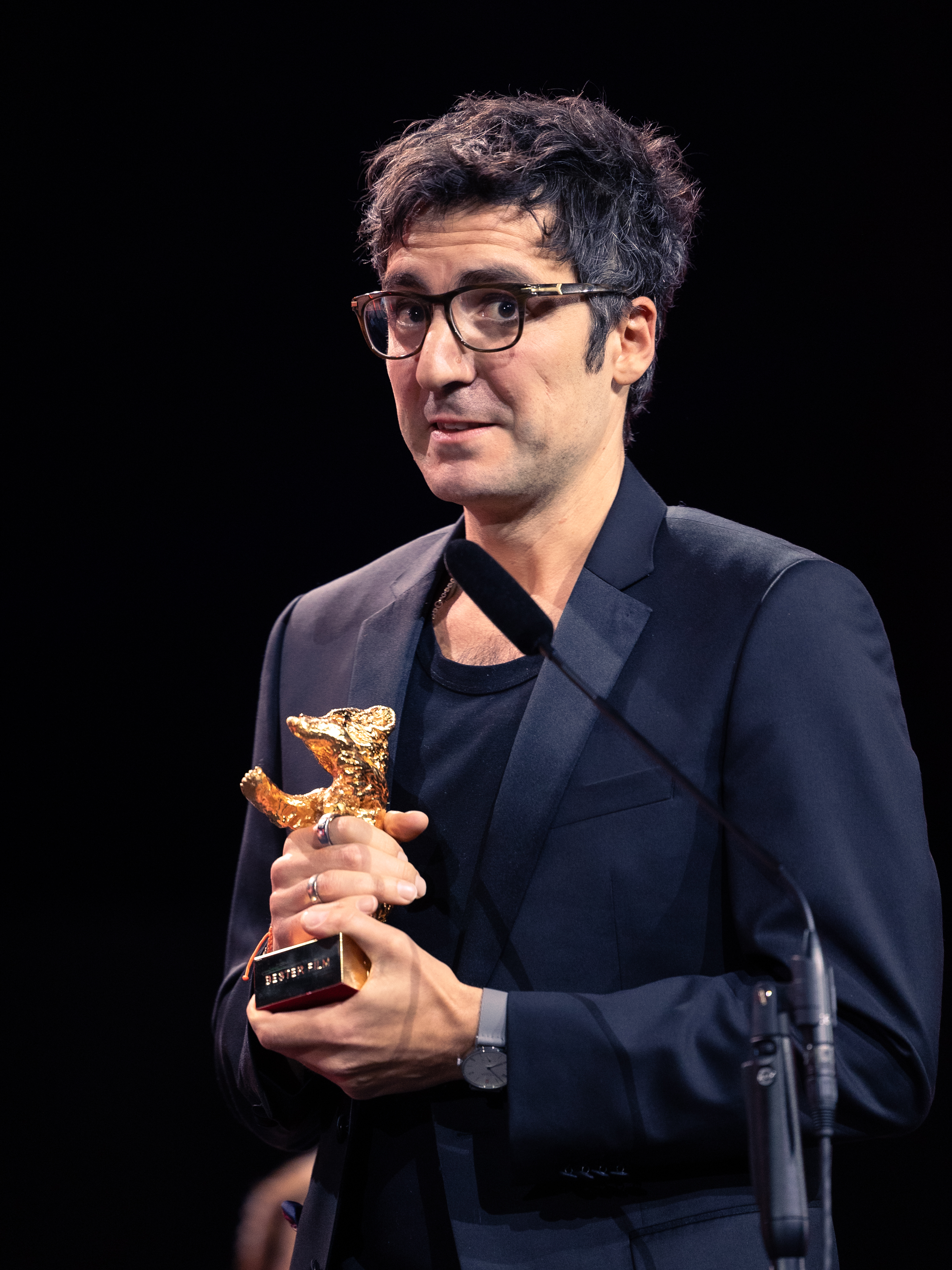
Çatak holding the Golden Bear at the 2026 Berlin International Film Festival

=== Feature films ===
Year	English Title	Original Title
2017	Once upon a time... Indianerland	Es war einmal Indianerland
2019	I Was, I Am, I Will Be	Es gilt das gesprochene Wort
2020	Blurred Lines	Räuberhände
2023	The Teachers' Lounge	Das Lehrerzimmer
2026	Yellow Letters	Gelbe Briefe
