= Ingo Fliess =

German film producer (born 1965)

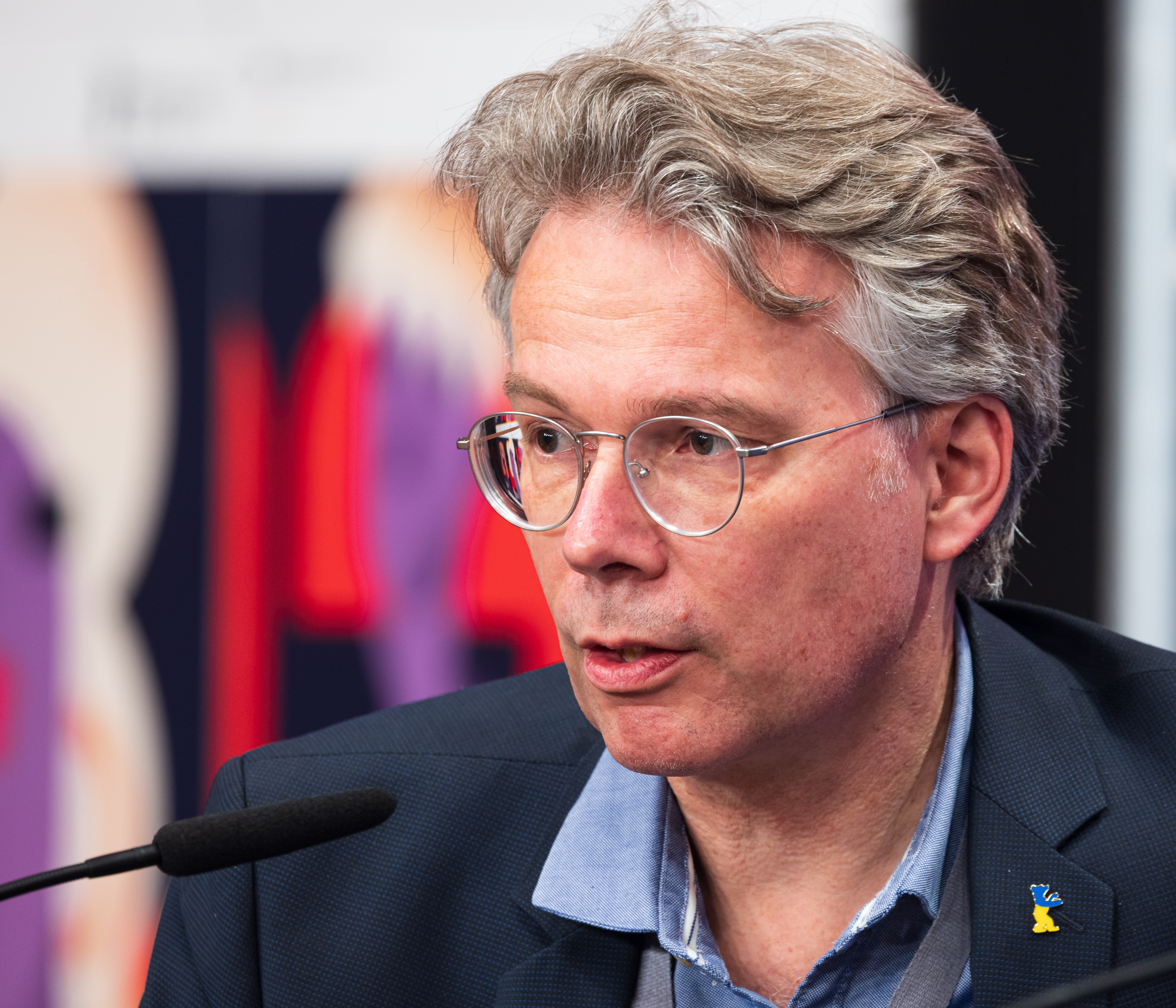
- Ingo Fliess (Berlinale 2023)
- Born: Sulzbach-Rosenberg, Germany
- Occupations: Film producer, entrepreneur
- Website: www.ifproductions.de

Ingo Fliess (born 1965 in Sulzbach-Rosenberg) is a German film producer and entrepreneur.

== Life ==
Fliess was born in 1965 and studied art history in Bamberg and Berlin until 1991. He subsequently worked for Verlag der Autoren as a screenwriter agent and script reader, eventually serving as managing director until 2005. In 2007, he founded the film studio "if... Productions," which has since specialized in auteur films and documentaries. A year later, he co-founded the company "DocCollection" with Jörg Adolph and Gereon Wetzel; the company became a distribution platform for DVDs. As a producer, he collaborated with Adolph on the films Elternschule and Vogelperspektiven. In 2023, the feature film Das Lehrerzimmer (The Teachers' Lounge), which he produced, won the German Film Award and was nominated for an Oscar in the "International Feature" category that same year.

Additionally, since January 2023, Fliess has been working as a professor at the University of Television and Film Munich, where he co-heads the "Production & Media Business" degree program alongside Corinna Mehner.

== Selected filmography ==
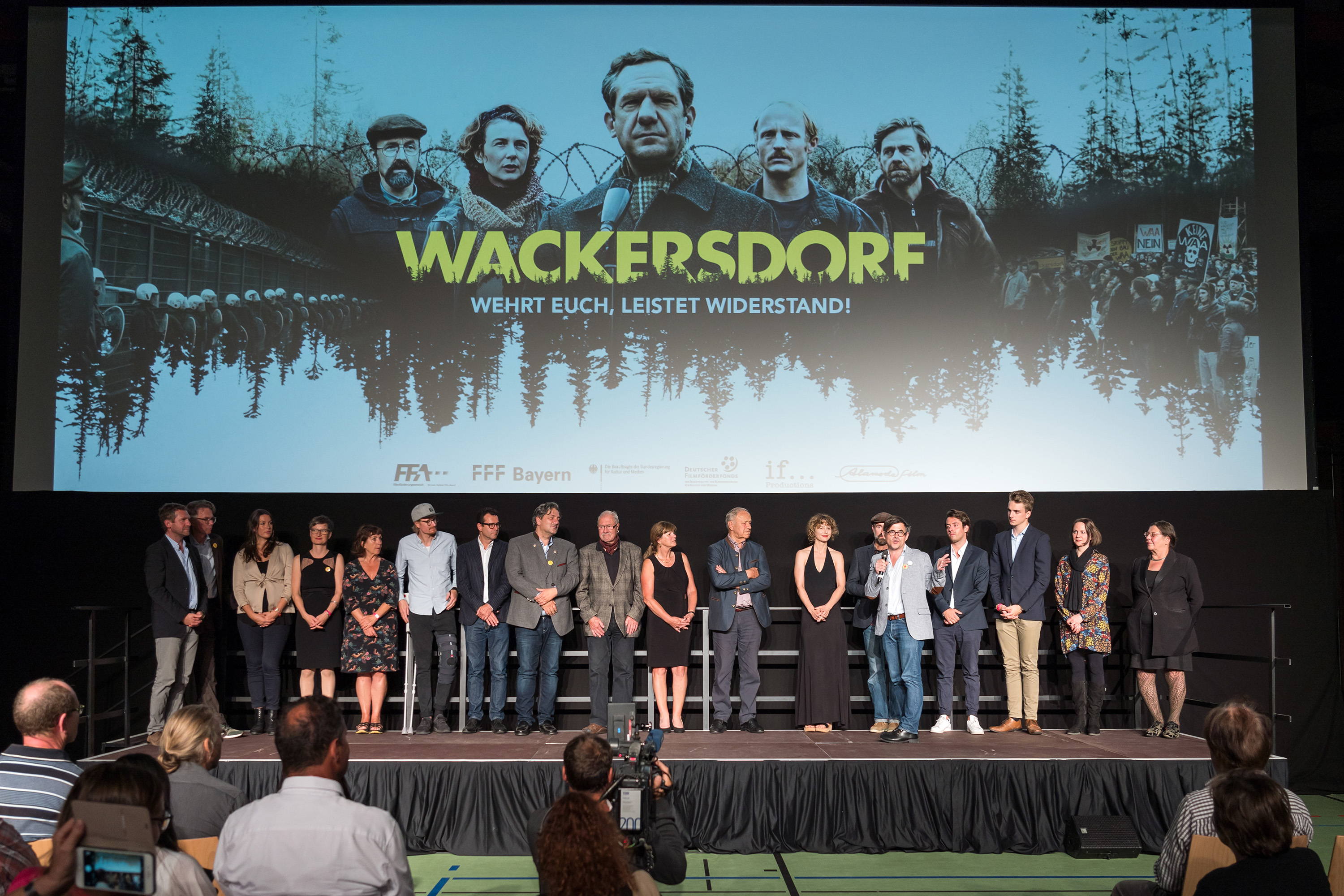
Wackersdorf (2018): Film about the fight against the WAA in Bavaria

Ingo Fliess filmography.

- 2006: Paula’s Secret (Paulas Geheimnis)
- 2010: My Life Off-Screen (Mein Leben im Off)
- 2013: My Way to Olympia (Mein Weg nach Olympia)
- 2014: A Gift from the Gods (Ein Geschenk der Götter)
- 2015: Mission Control Texas (Mission Control Texas)
- 2018: Parenting School (Elternschule)
- 2018: Wackersdorf
- 2019: I Was, I Am, I Will Be (Es gilt das gesprochene Wort)
- 2021: The Girl with the Golden Hands (Das Mädchen mit den goldenen Händen)
- 2022: The Silent Forest (Schweigend steht der Wald)
- 2022: Stories About Franz (Geschichten vom Franz)
- 2022: Meetings with a Poet – Michael Krüger (Verabredungen mit einem Dichter – Michael Krüger)
- 2023: Bird’s-Eye Views (Vogelperspektiven)
- 2023: The Teachers' Lounge (Das Lehrerzimmer)
- 2023: New Stories About Franz (Neue Geschichten vom Franz)
- 2025: Rosenthal (film) (Rosenthal / film about Hans Rosenthal)
- 2025: Leibniz – Chronicle of a Lost Painting (Leibniz – Chronik eines verschollenen Bildes)
- 2026: Yellow Letters (Gelbe Briefe)

== Selected awards ==
Ingo Fliess received several awards for his film productions

- 2014: New German Cinema Award (Promotional Award) as producer
- 2019: German Film Award – Nomination for Best Documentary Film for Elternschule
- 2020: German Film Award – Bronze Award for Best Feature Film for Es gilt das gesprochene Wort
- 2023: German Film Award – Gold Award for Best Feature Film for Das Lehrerzimmer
- 2026: Berlin International Film Festival – Golden Bear as producer of Yellow Letters
- 2026: German Film Award – Silver Award for Best Feature Film for Gelbe Briefe

== Film and audio documents ==
- Ingo Fliess masterclass at Filmschoolfest Munich, 2023
- Filmproduzent Ingo Fliess über den "deutschen Film" und eine Oscar-Nominierung (Ingo Fliess on "German cinema" and an Oscar Nomination)
- Ingo Fliess Interview - Deutscher Filmpreis 2020
- Ingo Fliess im Gespräch - Filmfestspiele Simmern 2020
- Deutscher Filmpreis 2026 - Gelbe Briefe - Bester Spielfilm Silber
