= Mission Control Texas =

2015 film

- Directed by: Ralf Bücheler
- Written by: Ralf Bücheler
- Produced by: Ingo Fliess
- Cinematography: Stefan Linn
- Edited by: Ralf Bücheler
- Release date: May 12, 2015 (Munich International Documentary Film Festival)
- Running time: 85 minutes
- Country: Germany
- Language: English

Mission Control Texas is a 2015 documentary film directed by Ralf Bücheler. The film explores the work of the atheist call-in-show The Atheist Experience in Austin, Texas.

== Film content ==
In the middle of the Bible Belt, in Austin, Texas, every Sunday a group of secular humanists debates on the cable-TV show The Atheist Experience religion and beliefs. Matt Dillahunty, one of the hosts of the webcast, appears to be especially harsh in debunking unfounded beliefs and even brings one of the Christian callers to rather come out as an advocate for slavery than distancing himself from the Bible. Repeatedly Dillahunty hangs up on callers when no progress is made in discussion and when the caller is inherently being dishonest or using fallacious arguments to rationalize beliefs.

Besides the atheist community Mission Control Texas shows bizarre worship ceremonies, a rodeo, miraculous healing and the distribution of groceries at a food bank. Everything is accompanied by prayer. Religion seems to be omnipresent. Nevertheless, participants of a Tea-Party-gathering complain about the lack of religious freedom in politics, meaning freedom only for the Christian religion.

A caller wants to know if there are atheists whose approach does more harm to the Freethought movement than good. Dillahunty seems to get the hint about his pushing manner of debating: "I have no problem with either diplomats or firebrands involved in the discussions surrounding this movement. I think, we need both, because I think, some people kind of need to be shocked into trying to challenge us."

== Production ==
Mission Control Texas was produced by Ingo Fliess (if... Productions) in coproduction with the University of Television and Film in Munich and the German public television station 3sat. It was additionally funded by FilmFernsehFonds Bayern with 30,000 Euros.

Director Ralf Bücheler chose a purely observational approach, without interviews or voice-over narration.

== Awards and nominations ==
Mission Control Texas premiered at the Max Ophüls Film Festival 2015, nominated in the category Best Documentary Film. It was first shown on 3Sat on June 14, 2015. A few days later it won the FFF-Förderpreis award at the Munich-based documentary film festival DOK.fest München 2015.
