= Wackersdorf (film) =

2018 German film by Oliver Haffner

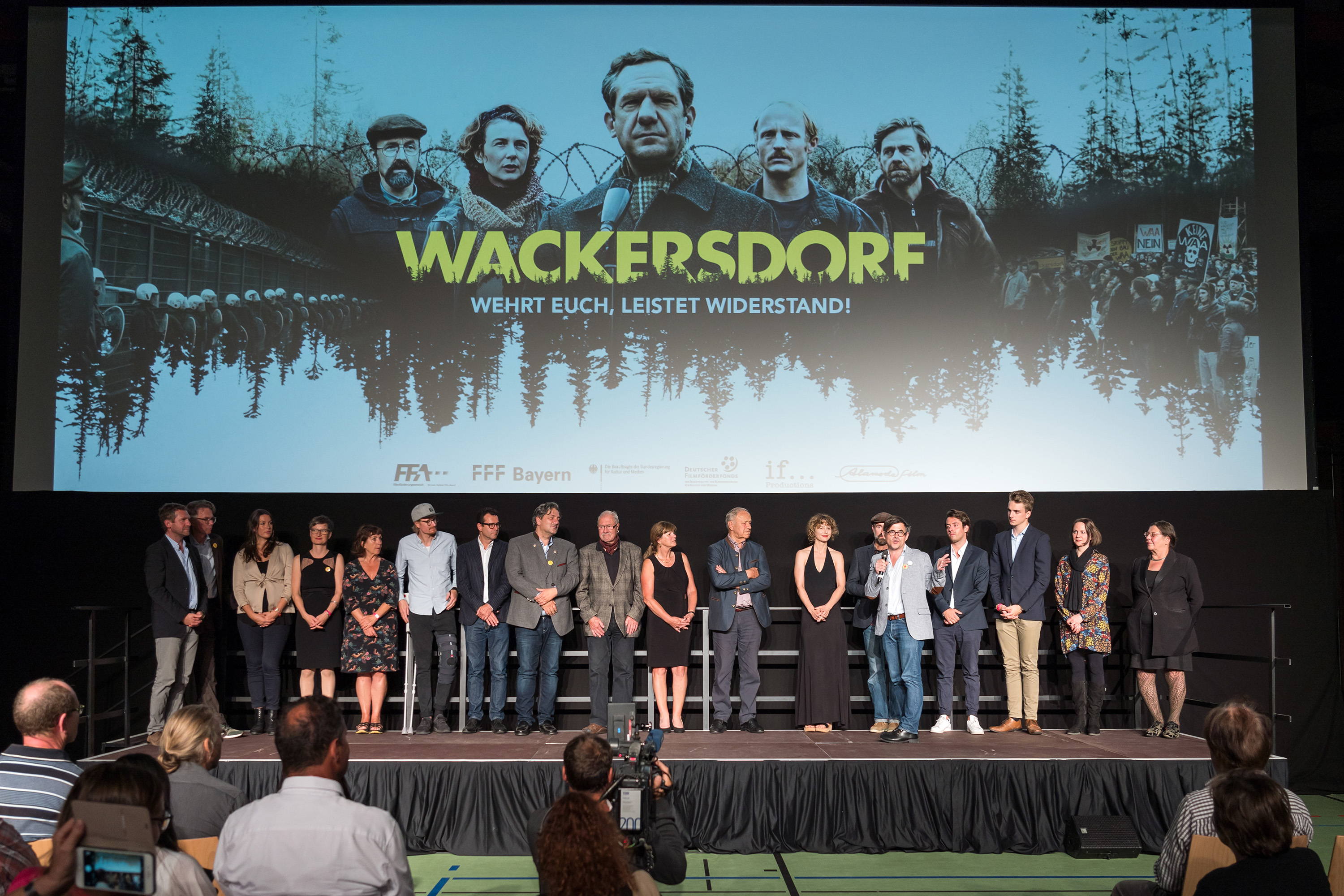
- Premiere in Schwandorf 2018
- Directed by: Oliver Haffner
- Screenplay by: Gernot Krää; Oliver Haffner
- Produced by: Ingo Fliess
- Starring: Johannes Zeiler; Anna Maria Sturm; Peter Jordan; Fabian Hinrichs; Sigi Zimmerschied; August Zirner; Frederic Linkemann; Johannes Herrschmann; Monika Manz; Marlene Morreis; Thomas Limpinsel; Andreas Bittl; Florian Brückner; Katharina Hauter; Andreas Nickl; Axel Röhrle; Ines Honsel; Veronika Wittmann; Timothy Battaglia; Harry Täschner; Tobias John von Freyend; Daniel Holzberg; Rainer Haustein; Jakob Spieler
- Cinematography: Kaspar Kaven
- Edited by: Anja Pohl
- Music by: Hochzeitskapelle
- Release date: 2018 (Germany)
- Running time: 122 minutes
- Country: Germany
- Language: German

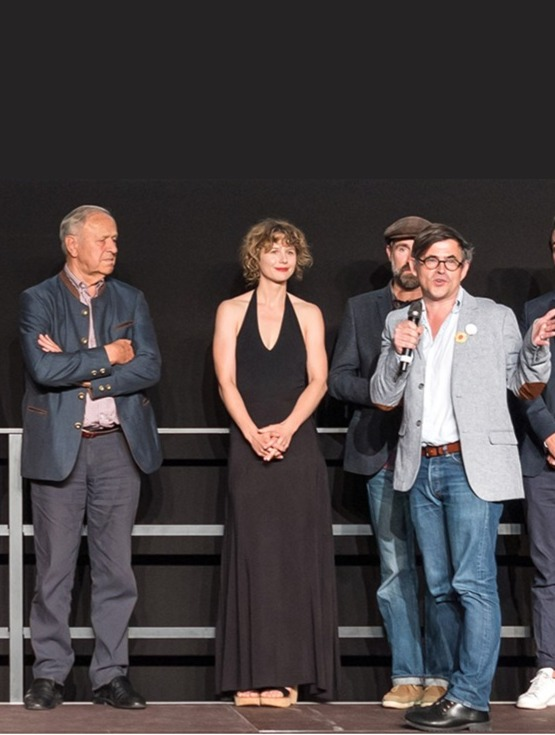
Hans Schuierer, Anna Maria Sturm, Oliver Haffner (2018)

Wackersdorf (working title: Stubborn) is a German feature film by Oliver Haffner from 2018 starring Johannes Zeiler as Hans Schuierer, the district administrator of the Schwandorf district, who fights against the Wackersdorf reprocessing plant (WAA) in Bavaria.

== Plot ==
In the 1980s, the Bavarian state government planned the construction of a nuclear reprocessing plant (WAA) in the municipality of Wackersdorf in the Upper Palatinate region. This was intended to bring economic growth to the Schwandorf district, which was experiencing rising unemployment. SPD District Administrator Hans Schuierer was under political pressure to create opportunities for the population. Therefore, he was initially enthusiastic about the idea of building the Wackersdorf reprocessing plant (WAA). He initially ignored isolated protests against the project.

Only when the Free State of Bavaria uses force against protests by a citizens' initiative advocating for the protection of nature in their homeland, without any legal basis, does Schuierer slowly begin to have doubts and start investigating whether the facility is really as harmless as claimed by the Franz Josef Strauss government.

He reads books on the subject and discusses it with the citizens' initiative against the WAA. Since the decision regarding the approval of building applications rests with him as district administrator, he sees himself in a strong position. However, the Bavarian state government passes a law that strips district administrators of their power ("Lex Schuierer"). The local SPD (Social Democratic Party) and the mayor of Wackersdorf turn against him.

In a speech at the WAA construction fence, Schuierer says that Franz Josef Strauss must have learned from his visits to authoritarian rulers and that he is practicing a "democracy." The Bavarian state government subsequently demands an apology from Schuierer, and when he refuses, the government initiates disciplinary proceedings against him.

Original film footage of the clashes between demonstrators and the police is shown.

On April 26, 1986, the Chernobyl nuclear disaster occurs. Construction of the WAA is halted in 1989.

== Production ==
Filming took place from October 5 to November 14, 2017, at original locations in the district of Schwandorf, the Regensburg City Library, and Munich. The film was produced by Munich-based if... Productions, with the participation of Bayerischer Rundfunk and Arte. Production was supported by the German Federal Film Fund, the FilmFernsehFonds Bayern, and the Federal Government Commissioner for Culture and the Media.

Christian Röhrs was responsible for costume design, Marc Parisotto for sound, Stephanie Maile for casting, Renate Schmaderer for production design, and Dana Bieler for makeup.[24] The mother of actress Anna Maria Sturm, politician Irene Maria Sturm from Schwandorf, was a prominent anti-nuclear power plant activist.

== Archival material used ==
Wackersdorf interweaves filmed scenes from the feature film with archival footage, attempting to recreate the visual language of the 1980s. The film incorporates the Chernobyl disaster of 1986 into the fictional narrative using archival clips from the Tagesschau news program. The legendary 1986 election campaign appearance of Bavarian minister-president Franz Josef Strauss in Schwandorf is also shown in two clips. The then Federal Minister of the Interior, Friedrich Zimmermann, is also included with a brief statement.

== Film producer as WAA protester ==
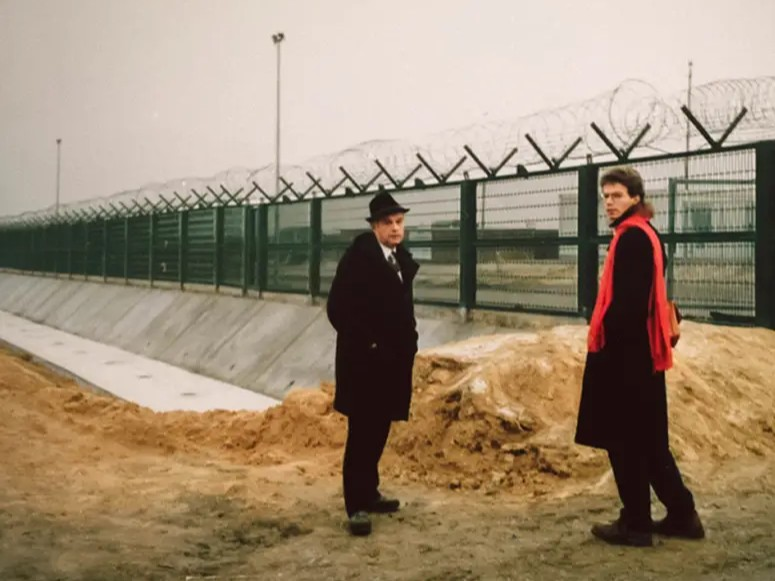
Producer Ingo Fliess as a demonstrator with his father at the WAA construction fence

Upper Palatinate film producer Ingo Fliess (if... Productions) experienced the protests against the WAA firsthand at the time. "I wasn't a brave fighter on the front lines - more of an ordinary demonstrator. The resistance against the WAA and the Strauß government changed our worldview; we became skeptical and angry in the face of such injustice."

== Release ==
The premiere took place on June 29, 2018, at the Munich Film Festival, where the production opened the New German Cinema section and received the Filmfest München Audience Award. The film was released in German cinemas on September 20, 2018, and in Austrian cinemas on September 21, 2018.

The film was first broadcast on Arte on June 5, 2020. In 2022, the film portrait Hans Schuierer: The Man Against the Nuclear Plant was released as part of Arte's documentary series Based on a True Story, which uses excerpts from the film.

== Reception ==
Jana Wolf, writing in the Mittelbayerische Zeitung, pointed out that the weakness of the otherwise gripping film lies in its inability to clearly distinguish between historical documentary and fictionalized account. "It seems the filmmakers wanted to combine both: to capture the power of the resistance 30 years ago on film while simultaneously maintaining the artistic freedom of fiction. This approach doesn't quite work out in the end."

Sascha Westphal, writing in the weekly newspaper Der Freitag, described it as an "extremely knowledgeable and admirably detailed reconstruction of a social conflict."

Andreas Fischer, in the Weser Kurier, called the film "an intelligent film about arbitrariness and resistance, about obedience and civil courage," which tells the story of the anti-nuclear protests in a nuanced, multifaceted, and extremely compelling way. The historical scenes at the WAA construction fence from the Tagesschau news program show how important it is "to doubt, to be courageous, and to stand up for democratic values. Then as now."

Heribert Prantl: "It is a magnificent film, a Heimatfilm in the best sense of the word, a film about small acts of resistance, which are sometimes great."

== Awards and nominations ==
- 2018: New German Cinema Award – Nominations in the categories of Director, Producer, and Screenplay
- 2018: Munich Film Festival – Filmfest München Audience Award
- 2019: German Film Critics' Award 2018 – Nomination in the category Best Actor (Johannes Zeiler)
- 2019: Bavarian Film Award 2018 – Special Prize
- 2019: Fajr International Film Festival 2019 – Silver Medal for Best Script
- 2019: German Film Award 2019 – Award in the category Best Film Score
- 2019: German Acting Award 2019 – Nomination in the category Best Actor in a Leading Role (Johannes Zeiler)
- 2019: Culture Prize of the Upper Palatinate District (Oliver Haffner)
- The German Film and Media Evaluation Board (FBW) awarded the film the rating "particularly valuable".

== Theater adaptation ==
A theater adaptation of the film premiered at the Amberg City Theater on March 12, 2022. The Swabian State Theater adapted Oliver Haffner's film for the stage and also created educational materials for it.

== Film ducuments ==
- Everything you always wanted to know about Wackersdorf - Siegmar Warnecke in conversation with Oliver Haffner, 93 min
- Report on the filming of the movie Wackersdorf, BR 2017
- Looking back to the future: "Wackersdorf", (GEP)-Filmshow 2018, 7 min
- Film discussion with Oliver Haffner, Deutsches Filminstitut 2019, 65 min
- Wackersdorf (2018) - Oliver Haffner in conversation with Felix Moeller 2019, 28 min
- Film premiere of Wackersdorf in Stuttgart with Oliver Haffner 2018, 15 min
- Film premiere of "Wackersdorf" with director in Amberg, OTV 2018, 6 min
