= Thomas Limpinsel =

German actor (born 1965)

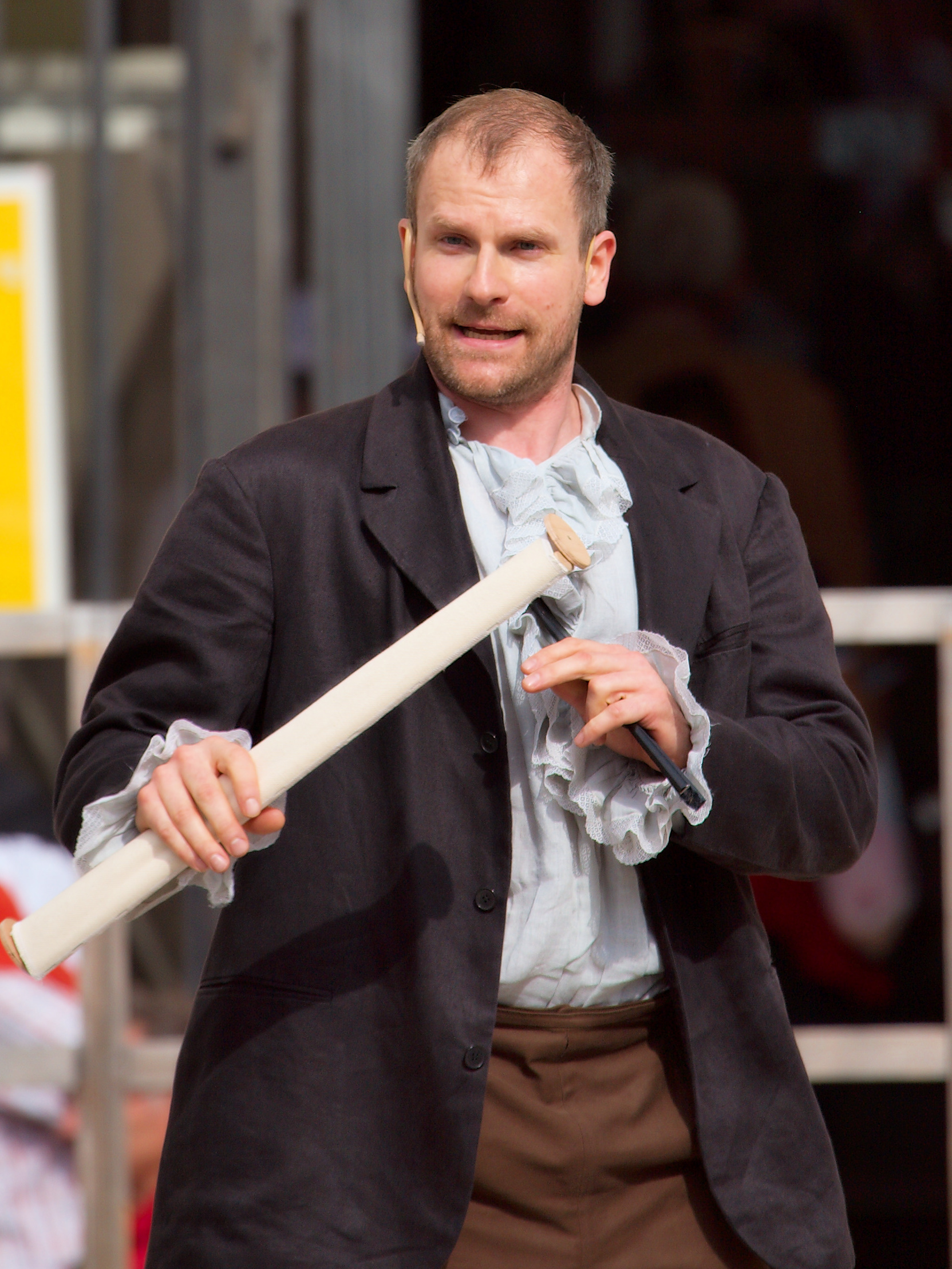
- Limpinsel at the 2008 Salzburg Festival
- Born: 1965 (age 60–61); Essen, West Germany
- Occupation: Actor
- Years active: 1992–present
- Known for: Downfall

Thomas Limpinsel (born 1965) is a German actor, known best for his role as Heinz Linge in Downfall.

== Life ==
Thomas Limpinsel studied acting in 1987 at the Hochschule für Musik, Theater und Medien Hannover. After his studies, he was initially engaged at the Lower Saxony State Theatre, had a guest engagement at the Stadttheater Hildesheim and in 1993 followed the director Eberhard Witt to the Bayerische Staatsschauspiel München, where he worked until 1997.

Since 1997, Limpinsel worked as a freelance Schauspieler and had guest engagements at the Bavarian State Theatre, Schauspielhaus Bochum, Burgtheater in Vienna, the Salzburg Festival, as well as the Komischen Oper, and the Renaissancetheater, along with the Schlossparktheater in Berlin.

Along with his theatre work, Thomas Limpinsel is present in many film and TV productions. This includes his role as Heinz Linge, the valet for Adolf Hitler, in the Oscar-nominated Bernd Eichinger film Downfall, die Sat1 Comedy Paare (which got nominated for an Emmy), the TV series Unser Lehrer Doktor Specht, the 2012 TV film Rommel, and in many episodes of the crime series Tatort.

Thomas Limpinsel speaks German along with fluent English and French.

== Selected filmography ==
- 1992: Unser Lehrer Doktor Specht (TV Series) - Drogendealer
- 1995: Der Trip
- 1997: Sketchup – The Next Generation (TV Series)
- 1999: Hotel Elfie (TV Series) - Bernd Bosch
- 2001-2018: Tatort (TV Series) - Gerd Schneider / Ludwig Wahlberg / Sven, Drogenpolizist / Johann Knauf / Tom Odetzki
- 2002-2005: Schulmädchen (TV Series) - Paul Heller
- 2004: Der Untergang - Heinz Linge
- 2004: A Pass from the Back - Mann vorm Fernseher
- 2004-2008: Um Himmels Willen (TV Series) - Max Bachmann
- 2005: Der Bulle von Tölz (TV Series) - Paul Heller
- 2005-2015: Die Rosenheim-Cops (TV Series) - Frederik Pradler / Eberhard Weinberger / Robert Thoma / Ludwig Mosch
- 2006: Shoppen - Egon
- 2006: Kommissar Stolberg (TV Series) - Dr. Ulrich Jansen
- 2008: Der Kaiser von Schexing
- 2008: Geliebte Clara (German version) - Tausch (voice)
- 2009: Tod aus der Tiefe (TV Movie) - Holger Schneider
- 2010: Hinter blinden Fenstern (TV Movie) - Dr. Justus Dornkam
- 2010: Der letzte Bulle (TV Series) - Arne Pohl
- 2010: Colors in the Dark - Mathis
- 2011: The Tuesday Ladies (TV Movie) - Frido Kerkhoff
- 2011: Kann denn Liebe Sünde sein? (TV Movie) - Paul
- 2011: Die Muse - Fischer
- 2012: Rommel (TV Movie) - Horst
- 2012-2017: Hubert ohne Staller (TV Series) - Gerd Kessler / Dominik Lorenz
- 2012-2021: Katie Fforde - Janosch Wieler / Paul Schulz / Jason Cornway / Michael Bollack
- 2013: Ruby Red - Mr. Southfolk 1912
- 2013: München Mord (TV Series) - Gustav Bernlocher
- 2014: Sieben Tage ohne (TV Movie) - Frido Kerkhoff
- 2014: Unter Verdacht (TV Series) - Hortinger
- 2014: Monsoon Baby (TV Movie) - Dominik Volkert
- 2014: Hirngespinster - Polizist Autobahnbrücke
- 2014-2019: Rosamunde Pilcher (TV Series) - Hugh Crankshaw / Winston Holmes
- 2015: Die Dienstagsfrauen – Zwischen Kraut und Rüben (TV Movie)
- 2015: Heldt (TV Series) - Günter Rositzki
- 2015: Wilsberg (TV Series) - Labuske
- 2015: Abschussfahrt - Helmut
- 2015: Süßer September (TV Movie) - Johann
- 2015: Über den Tag hinaus (TV Movie) - Michael
- 2015: Die Maßnahme - Behringer
- 2015: Notruf Hafenkante (TV Series) - Rainer Dorfmann
- 2016: The Most Beautiful Day - Sicherheitsmann Flughafen
- 2016: In aller Freundschaft – Die jungen Ärzte (TV Series) - Theodor Kelster
- 2016-2019: Der Lehrer (TV Series) - Thorsten Dehler
- 2017: Mord in bester Gesellschaft (TV Series) - Pathologe
- 2017: Ein Kind wird gesucht (TV Movie) - Pastor
- 2017: Only God Can Judge Me - Dienstgruppenleiter
- 2017-2018: Hubert ohne Staller (TV Series) - Gerd Kessler / Dominik Lorenz
- 2018: Wackersdorf - Gegenfurtner
- 2018: Heiter bis tödlich: Morden im Norden (TV Series) - Frank Schneider
- 2019: Gipfelstürmer – Das Berginternat (TV Series) - Dr. Gregor Berz
- 2019: The Collini Case - Forensic Pathologist
- 2019: Nimm Du ihn (TV Movie) - Brokopp
- 2021: Faltenfrei - Georg

== Theatre ==
- Salzburg Festival in Jedermann as "Dünner Vetter" (2007 to 2012)
- Salzburg Festival in Jedermann for a person (2008)
