= Matt Dillahunty =

American atheist activist (born 1969)

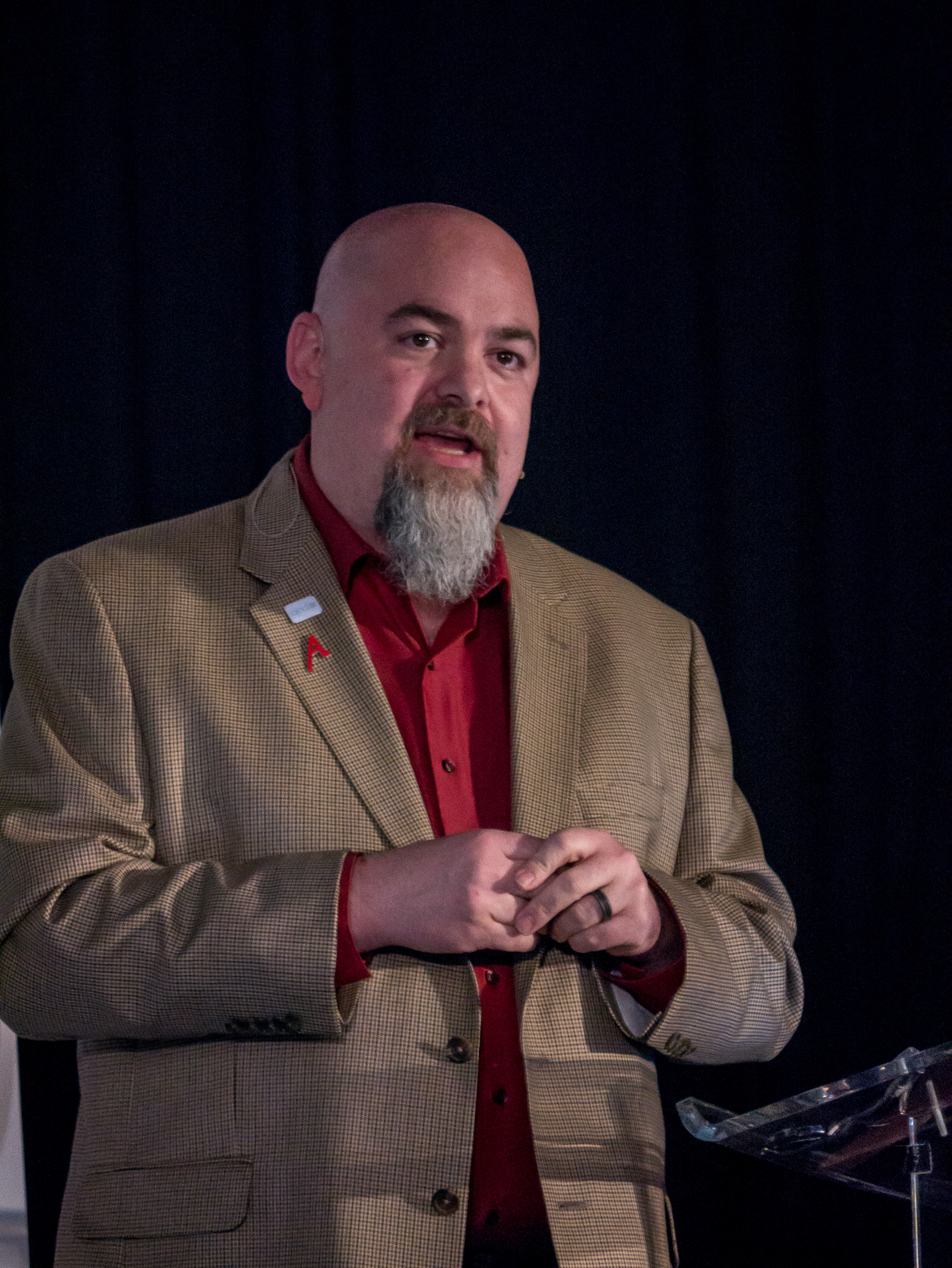
- Dillahunty speaking at QED in 2015
- Born: Matthew Wade Dillahunty; March 31, 1969 (age 57); Kansas City, Missouri, U.S.
- Known for: Atheism and secularism
- Spouse: Beth Presswood (m. 2011; div. 2018)
- Military career
- Branch: United States Navy
- Service years: 1987–1995

Matthew Wade Dillahunty (born March 31, 1969) is an American atheist activist and former president of the Atheist Community of Austin, a position he held from 2006 to 2013. Between 2005 and October 2022, Dillahunty was host of the televised webcast The Atheist Experience. He formerly hosted the live Internet radio show Non-Prophets Radio and founded the counter-apologetics project Iron Chariots.

Dillahunty is a regularly invited speaker, or debate participant, for local secular organizations and university groups as part of the Secular Student Alliance Speakers Bureau. In the summer of 2017, Dillahunty joined a speaking tour where he shared the stage with fellow atheists Sam Harris, Richard Dawkins, and Lawrence Krauss.

== Biography ==
Raised Southern Baptist, Dillahunty considered becoming a minister. His in-depth examination of his Christian beliefs, instead of bolstering his faith as he had intended, led him to no longer believe in the basic tenets of Christianity and, eventually, all religions. Dillahunty spent eight years in the U.S. Navy before leaving to work in the field of computer software design. Dillahunty later became a founding member of the Counter-Strike team Clan Killers 3 and participated in early Cyberathlete Professional League events and the QuakeCon 1997 event. He now streams a variety of video games regularly on Twitch.

He first co-hosted The Atheist Experience in March 2005 and would go on to become a regular host of the program. In October 2011, he married The Atheist Experience colleague and co-host of the Godless Bitches podcast Beth Presswood; the couple divorced in 2018. On the October 2, 2022, broadcast of The Atheist Experience, Dillahunty announced that that episode would be his last as host after seventeen years of participation. Dillahunty immediately moved over to The Line, another YouTube channel focused on religious debates.

Dillahunty describes himself as a feminist. He is one of the subjects of the documentary films My Week in Atheism (2014), and Mission Control Texas (2015). He is also a magician. He has no university degrees and did not attend seminary.

== Work ==
=== Speaking and debates ===
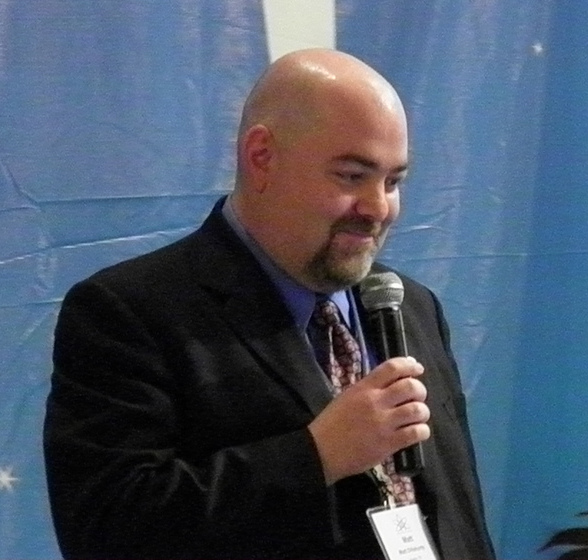
Dillahunty speaking at the American Atheists Convention 2011

Dillahunty has said "I am absolutely convinced from my experience and the evidence that I've gathered over the years of doing this that [debates] are incredibly valuable." He has spoken at atheist and freethought conferences around the country and debated numerous Christian apologists, including Ray Comfort (on The Atheist Experience) and David Robertson on Premier Christian Radio's Unbelievable.

At the 2014 American Atheists convention in Salt Lake City, he gave a workshop that outlined some key ideas in effective debating: "Take the opponent seriously: 'The audience has to sense that I can perfectly understand their views, and have rejected them.' Use logic: 'I tell them that I can write a better book than the Bible. Simple: I copy it word for word, except the parts about slavery.' And don't forget emotion: 'It is theater. That is my advantage with a Baptist background over someone like Richard Dawkins, although he knows more about science.'" He has also stated that he is willing to say "I don't know" in a debate, a "scary concept" to some of his audience.

Alongside fellow activists Seth Andrews and Aron Ra, he traveled to Australia in March 2015 as a member of the Unholy Trinity Tour. In April 2015 he was an invited speaker at the Merseyside Skeptics Society QEDCon in Manchester, United Kingdom. In 2018, Dillahunty participated in a discussion with Canadian psychology professor Jordan Peterson in which they encountered areas of disagreement about religion, specifically its relationship with values and culture.

=== Views on morality ===
One of Dillahunty's recurring themes has been the superiority of secular morality over religious morality. His key contentions on the issue are that secular moral systems are inclusive, dynamic, encourage change, and serve the interests of the participants, whereas religious moral systems are merely unjustified pronouncements. He touched on the subject again at a lecture at the 2013 American Atheists Convention in Austin: "They say we're immoral, when we're the only ones who understand that morality is derived from empathy, fairness, cooperation, and the physical facts about interacting in this universe. They've broken their moral compass and sacrificed their humanity on the altar of religion. They say we're lost and broken and in need of salvation, when we're the ones who are free." Dillahunty holds the view that advocating infinite reward or punishment for finite deeds is "morally inferior".

=== Advocacy of abortion rights ===
Dillahunty speaking about debating at the American Atheist National Convention 2014

Dillahunty has advocated for abortion rights. After hearing that Secular Pro-Life set up a table at the 2012 American Atheists convention, Dillahunty challenged a representative of the organization to a public debate on the issue. The debate took place at the 2012 Texas Freethought Convention, with Dillahunty debating Kristine Kruszelnicki. Dillahunty used bodily autonomy as his primary argument for abortion rights. In March 2014, Dillahunty debated Clinton Wilcox, who is not a member of Secular Pro-Life, though the debate was advertised on their blog. The aftermath led to a falling out with the organization, and Dillahunty announced in a Facebook post that he would not debate them in public again. He and Beth Presswood later appeared on Amanda Marcotte's podcast RH Reality Check to explain the events of the preceding years, and said that "the optics of a cis male without a womb" debating women's rights is not what he wanted to advocate, and would let others take the lead in public on the issue.

=== Skepticism ===
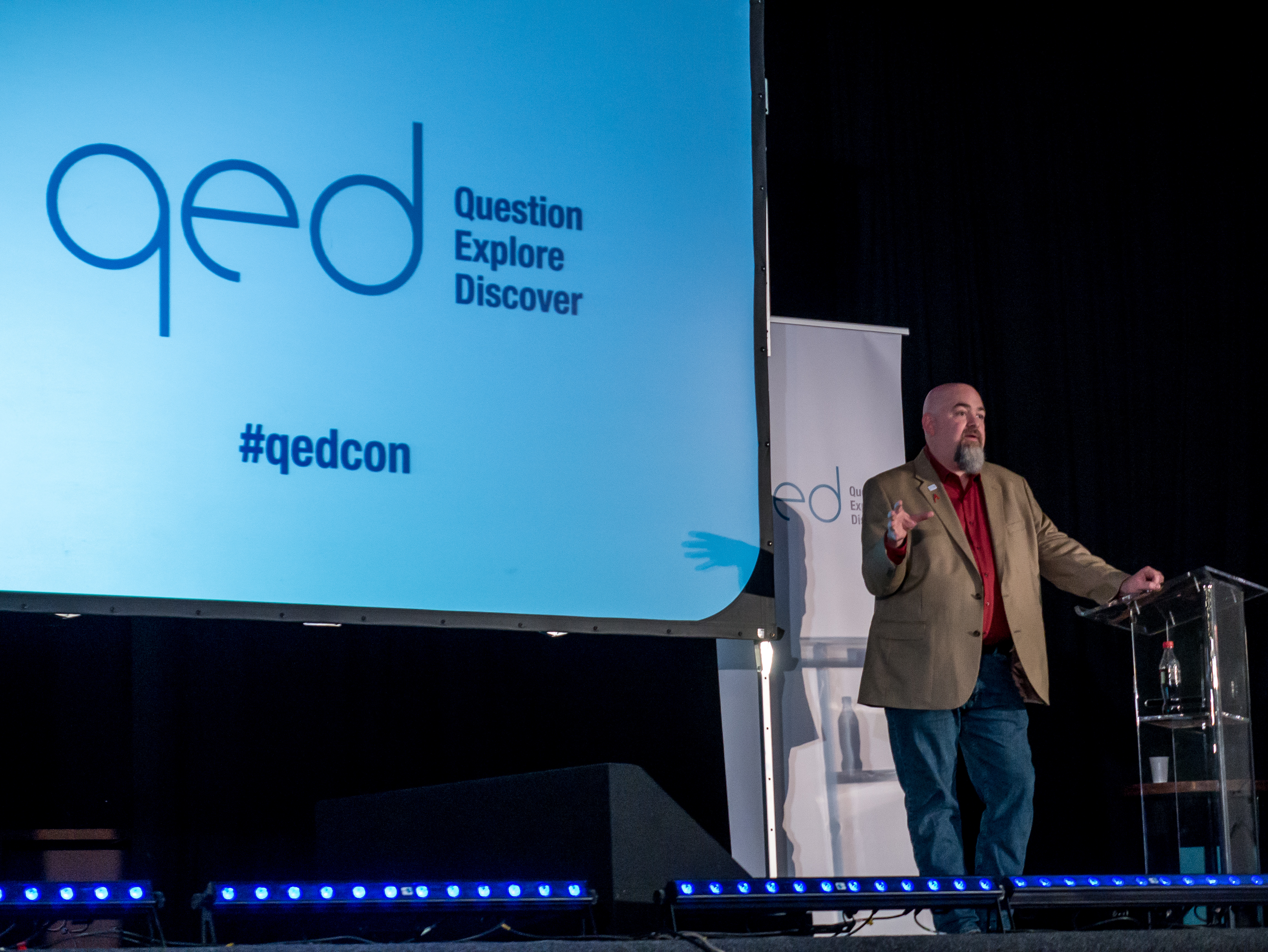
Dillahunty at QED 2015, a skeptical conference in Manchester

Advocacy of the primacy of skepticism is another of Dillahunty's recurring themes. He said at the American Atheists convention in Austin in 2013 that the closest thing he has to a motto is "to believe as many true things and as few false things as possible," taking his inspiration from David Hume. In the same lecture, he said that being a skeptic is the most important identifier of who he is. In addition, Dillahunty said that skepticism has something to say about untested religious claims, and that philosophical skepticism will lead to atheism. He sees atheism as a subset of skepticism, and he does not see why skepticism should not address religious claims, something that has become a point of controversy in the skeptic community.

Dillahunty rhetorically asked, "how popular would psychics be, how popular would ghosts be, if there wasn't this monolithic idea that 70-80% of the population believe, that within each of us is an eternal soul that leaves the body when we're dead and either goes on to some afterlife or lingers around here on the Earth?...If you teach people about what we know, about what most likely happens when we die, they will strive to treat people better while they're alive, and their grief will be lessened because they understand reality." He admonished "don't just do skepticism with the goal of getting it right, do it with the goal of not being able to get it wrong." In an interview published by the Norwegian Humanist Association, he said he does not see why religious claims about reality should be treated any differently by skeptics than conspiracy theories and allegations about alien visitation.

==== Gumball analogy ====
Dillahunty's explanation of the philosophical burden of proof is often illustrated through the 'gumball' analogy, conceived by then co-host Tracie Harris: if a hypothetical jar is filled with an unknown quantity of gumballs, any positive claim regarding there being an odd, or even, number of gumballs has to be logically regarded as highly suspect in the absence of supporting evidence. Following this, if one does not believe the unsubstantiated claim that "the number of gumballs is even", it does not automatically mean (or even imply) that one 'must' believe that the number is odd. Similarly, unbelief in the unsupported claim "There is a god" does not automatically mean that one 'must' believe that there is no god. This line of reasoning is intended to demonstrate that there is a neutral position. The common retort, "What is your proof that there is no god?" therefore is a strawman fallacy when applied to those who have the neutral position (as well as potentially being a fallacious shifting of the burden of proof).

== Awards ==
In 2011, Dillahunty was awarded the Atheist of the Year award, nicknamed the "Hitchie" for Christopher Hitchens, by Staks Rosch writing for Examiner.com. The award process involved Rosch's readers voting for nominees he selected.

He received the 2012 Catherine Fahringer Freethinker of the Year Award from the Freethinkers Association of Central Texas.
