= I Was, I Am, I Will Be =

2019 film

- Promotional poster
- Directed by: İlker Çatak
- Produced by: Ingo Fliess
- Starring: Anne Ratte-Polle; Oğulcan Arman Uslu
- Distributed by: X Verleih AG (though Warner Bros.)
- Release date: 2 July 2019 (MIFF)
- Running time: 120 minutes
- Country: Germany
- Languages: German; Turkish; English

I Was, I Am, I Will Be (German: Es gilt das gesprochene Wort) is a 2019 German drama film directed by İlker Çatak.

== Plot ==
Poor Kurdish male prostitute Baran wants to start a new life in Germany with the help of pilot Marion.

== Cast ==
- Anne Ratte-Polle - Marion Bach
- Oğulcan Arman Uslu - Baran
- Godehard Giese - Raphael
- Sebastian Urzendowsky - Johann
- Johanna Polley - Leonie
- Jörg Schüttauf - Mark
