= Uygar Tamer =

Turkish-Swiss actor (born 1971)

Uygar Tamer (born 1971 in Ankara, Turkey) is a Turkish-Swiss actress and singer.

== Early life and education ==
Tamer was born in Ankara in 1971. At the age of eleven, she moved to Zurich, where her mother was posted as an attaché. She received her primary education at Turkish, French, and Swiss schools and learned six languages. Tamer trained as an actress from 1996 to 1998 at the European Film Actor School in Zurich.

Alongside her film work, Tamer completed her studies in Social Work at the Zurich University of Applied Sciences (ZHAW) in 2013. That same year, she starred in the drama-comedy Swiss Heroes by Peter Luisi, playing Bahar, one of the asylum seekers performing Schiller's "Wilhelm Tell." The popular actress received several awards, including the Audience Award at the Locarno Film Festival, the St. Louis International Film Festival, and the Best of Festival Award at the Richmond Film Festival.

== Career ==
Her first role was at the age of ten in the film At by Ali Özgentürk. In 2009, she played the lead role in the French-Canadian-Swiss co-production Dirty Money, L'Infiltré by Dominique Othenin-Girard, which earned her a Quartz award from the Swiss Film Institute in the category of Best Young Actress. In 2010, she appeared in Quantum of Solace as Quantum Member Number 4.

In 2016, Tamer became known to a wider audience through her role in The Victims – Don't Forget Me, the second part of the ARD television film trilogy In the Middle of Germany: NSU about the murder series of the National Socialist Underground (NSU), directed by Züli Aladağ. Tamer played Adile Şimşek, the wife of the first victim Enver Şimşek, and the mother of Kerim and Semiya Şimşek (book: Painful Homeland). For her role in the NSU trilogy In the Middle of Germany, Tamer received the German Acting Award 2017 for Best Supporting Actress. In 2018, she played one of the lead roles in the Tatort episode Die Musik stirbt zuletzt (The Music Dies Last), a one-take film.

== Personal life ==
Tamer lives in Zurich.

== Filmography (selection) ==
- 1982: At – My Horse (At) – Director: Ali Özgentürk, Feature Film
- 2000: Cut Away – Director: Eva Marel Jura
- 2001: Dansöz – Director: Savaş Ay, Feature Film
- 2002: Ferrari – Director: Nicolo Settegrana
- 2003: Fairy Tale Prince – Director: Jakob M. Erwa
- 2008: Dirty Money (Dirty Money, the Infiltrator) – Director: Dominique Othenin-Girard, Feature Film
- 2008: Quantum of Solace (James Bond 007) – Director: Marc Forster, Feature Film
- 2012: Fallwind – Director: Bettina Eberhard
- 2014: Swiss Heroes – Director: Peter Luisi – Audience Award, Locarno Film Festival 2014, Feature Film
- 2016: The Victims – Don't Forget Me – Part 2 of the NSU Trilogy – Director: Züli Aladağ, TV Film, ARD WDR
- 2017: Wilder (TV Series) – Director: Pierre Monnard, Series, SRF
- 2017: Grossstadtrevier – Blood Feud – Director: Nina Wolfrum, TV Series, ARD
- 2017: The Teacher – Director: Peter Gersina, TV Series, RTL
- 2018: For My Daughter – Director: Stephan Lacant, TV Film, ZDF
- 2018: Omar and Us – Director: Mehmet Bahadır Er & Maryna Er Horbatsch
- 2018: Tatort: Die Musik stirbt zuletzt (Tatort: The Music Dies Last) – ONE-TAKE – Director: Dani Levy, TV series, SRF
- 2021: Wo ist die Liebe hin (Where Has Love Gone) (TV film)
- 2022: Das Lehrerzimmer (The Teachers' Room) (Feature film) – Director: İlker Çatak
- 2022: Kommt ein Vogel geflogen (A Bird Comes Flying) – Director: Christian Werner

== Awards ==
- 2010: Swiss Film Award Quartz "Best Young Actress" for Sükran in Dirty Money L'infiltré
- 2017: German Acting Award 2017 – Best Supporting Actress for NSU: The Victims – Don't Forget Me
