= Madeleine Petrovic List =

Madeleine Petrovic List Liste Madeleine Petrovic
- Abbreviation: LMP
- Leader: Madeleine Petrovic
- Founders: Madeleine Petrovic, Monika Henninger-Erber, Nora Summer, Harald Haas, Kyra Borchhardt
- Founded: 14 May 2024
- Split from: The Greens – The Green Alternative
- Ideology: Green politics Anti-vaccination; COVID-19 scepticism
- Political position: Centre-left
- Colours: Purple; Yellow
- National Council: 0 / 183
- Federal Council: 0 / 61

Website
- liste-petrovic.at

The Madeleine Petrovic List (German: Liste Madeleine Petrovic; LMP) is a green and COVID-19 sceptical political party in Austria founded by former Green spokeswoman Madeleine Petrovic in May 2024. The party participated in the 2024 Austrian legislative election in all Austrian states.

== History ==
Madeleine Petrovic was the federal spokeswoman of The Greens – The Green Alternative from 1994 to 1996 and the state spokeswoman of the Lower Austria party branch for 13 years, leaving the position in 2015. Shortly before the split, Petrovic called the creation of a new party "an inevitable step" as differences between her and The Greens leadership grew.

The Madeleine Petrovic List was officially founded on 14 May 2024. The majority of LMP members are former members of The Greens – The Green Alternative, and members of the association "Greens for Fundamental Rights and Freedom of Information" (German: Grüne für Grundrechte und Informationsfreiheit; GGI), previously known as the "Greens against Compulsory Vaccination & 2G" (German: Grüne gegen Impfpflicht & 2G). The association was founded in 2021 and opposes measures to contain the COVID-19 pandemic, as well as mandatory vaccination. Petrovic herself is one of the association's prominent members.

Madeleine Petrovic has announced that her list plans to participate in the 2024 Austrian legislative election. At the beginning of August, Madeleine Petrovic announced that her list had managed to collect all 2,600 signatures to participate in the elections in all states of Austria.

== Ideology ==
Madeleine Petrovic named the measures taken by the ÖVP-Green government during the COVID-19 pandemic as the main reason for the split. According to Petrovic, her list is aimed at reconciliation after the coronavirus period and active peace politics. In Petrovic's view, the "mainstream green politics" has developed in the wrong direction and is "problematic". Petrovic believes that her list will attract voters who are critical of the measures to fight COVID-19 and who did not want to vote for the Freedom Party of Austria.

Also, the main declared goals of LMP is the protection of the environment and animal rights.

== Election results ==
=== National Council ===
Election	Leader	Votes	%	Seats	+/–	Government
2024	Madeleine Petrovic	28,488	0.58 (#8)	0 / 183	New	Extra-parliamentary

== See also ==
- Peter Pilz List
