= Maria Windhager =

Austrian lawyer (born 1967)

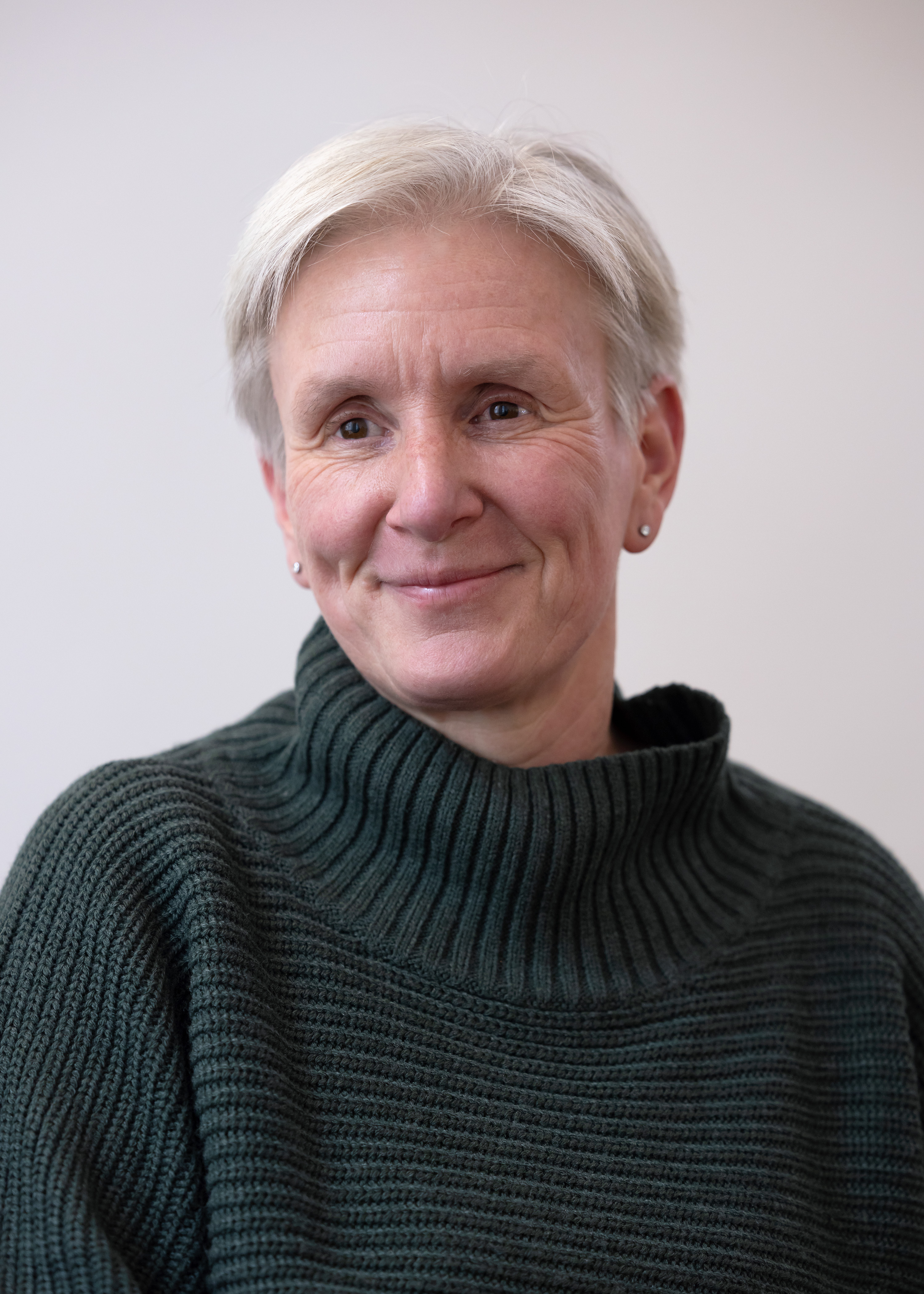
- Windhager in 2023
- Born: 1967 (age 58–59); Linz, Austria
- Citizenship: Austria
- Education: University of Salzburg; University of Vienna
- Occupation: Lawyer
- Known for: Media law specialist; notable rulings on hate speech and media rights
- Website: medienrechtskanzlei.at

Maria Windhager (born 1967) is an Austrian lawyer specializing in media law.

== Life and work ==
Windhager was born in 1967 in Linz. She studied law at the University of Salzburg and the University of Vienna, where she received her doctorate in law (Dr. iur.) in 2000. She works as a lawyer specializing in media law and privacy law.

As a media lawyer, she became known, for representing the Standard publishing house for several years.

She ended this advisory mandate in February 2024. In a landmark case in 2019, she obtained a ruling from the European Court of Justice for her client Eva Glawischnig, which established that Facebook can be compelled internationally to delete hate speech. She successfully represented Helge Fahrnberger, the founder of kobuk.at, against a defamation lawsuit brought by the tabloid journalist Richard Schmitt. Fahrnberger is thus still allowed to make the claim: "When Richard Schmitt writes something, the probability that it's untrue is quite high. When it's about traffic, it approaches 100%."

Windhager also represents the Green Party MP Sigrid Maurer in the fight against hate speech. Furthermore, she has won several rulings to strengthen the protection of children as victims in the media.

== Features and memberships ==
Maria is or was a member of the following institutions:

- Vienna Bar Association
- Editorial Advisory Board (2000–2005)
- ORF Public Council (1998–2004)
- Juridikum: Editor-in-Chief 1991–2000, Co-Editor 2000–2003, currently Scientific Advisory Board
