= 1990 Austrian legislative election =

← 1986	7 October 1990	1994 →

All 183 seats in the National Council 92 seats needed for a majority
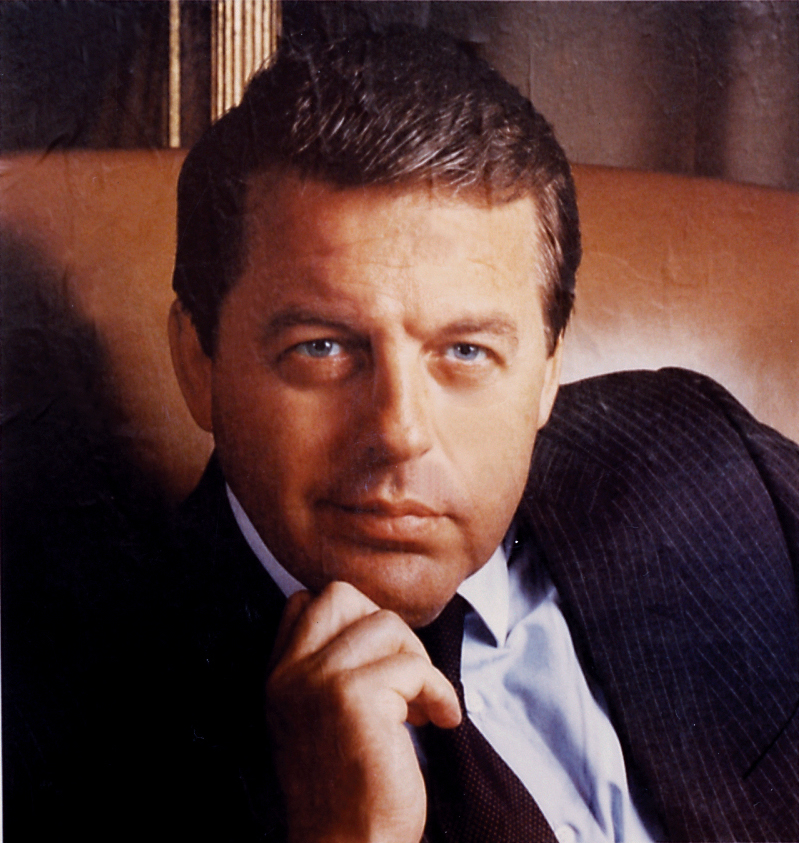

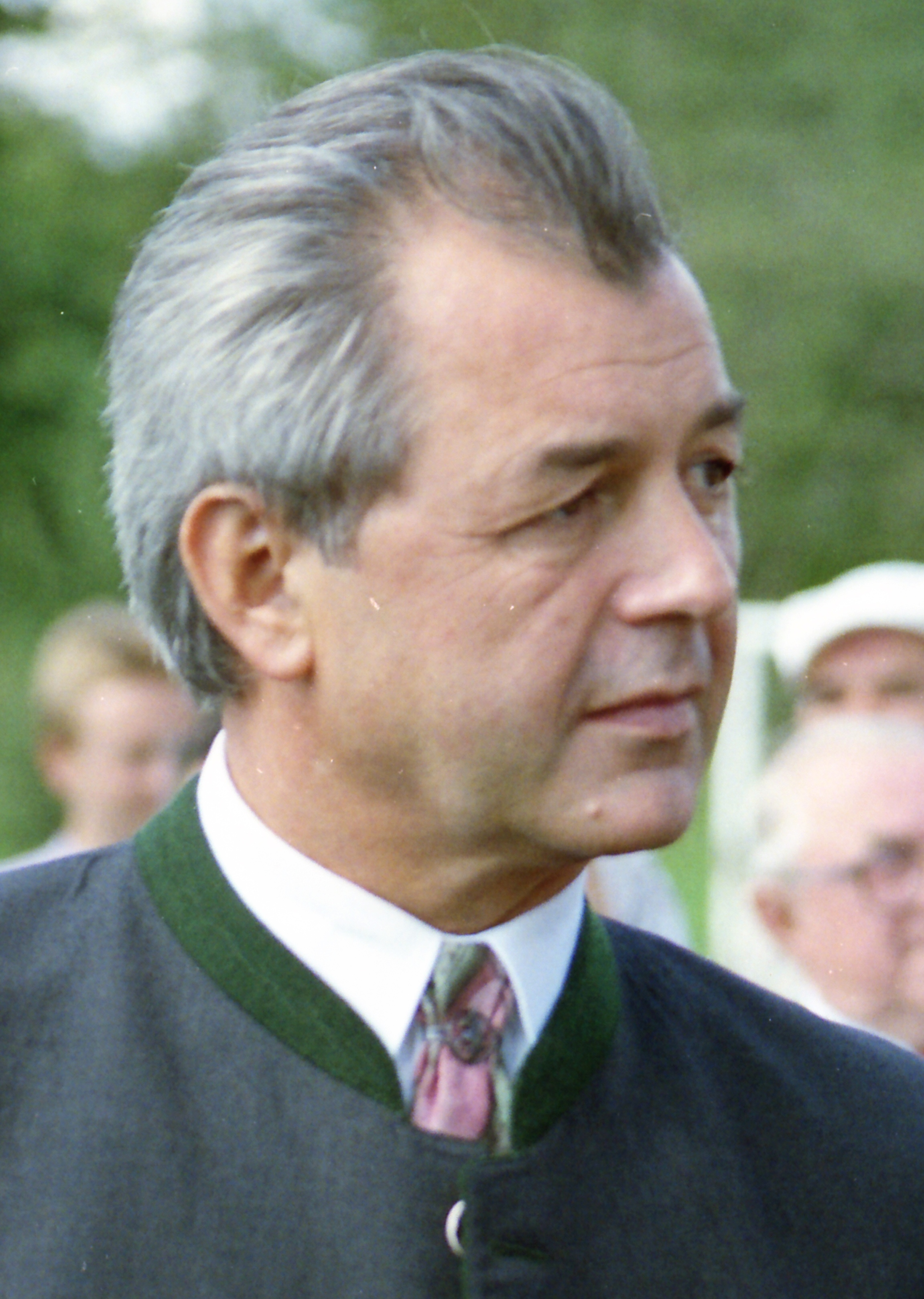

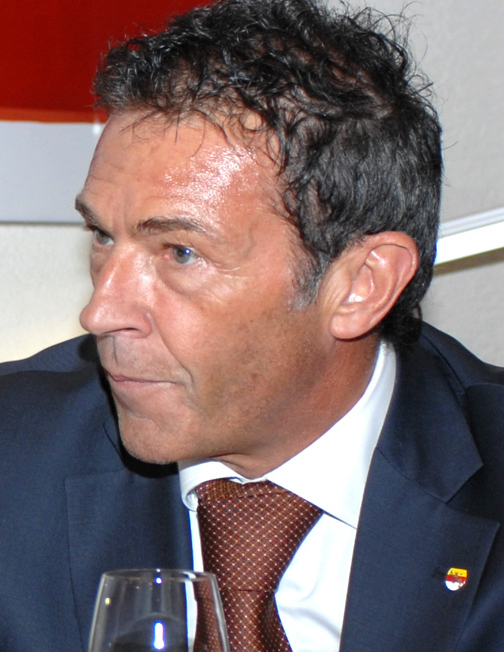

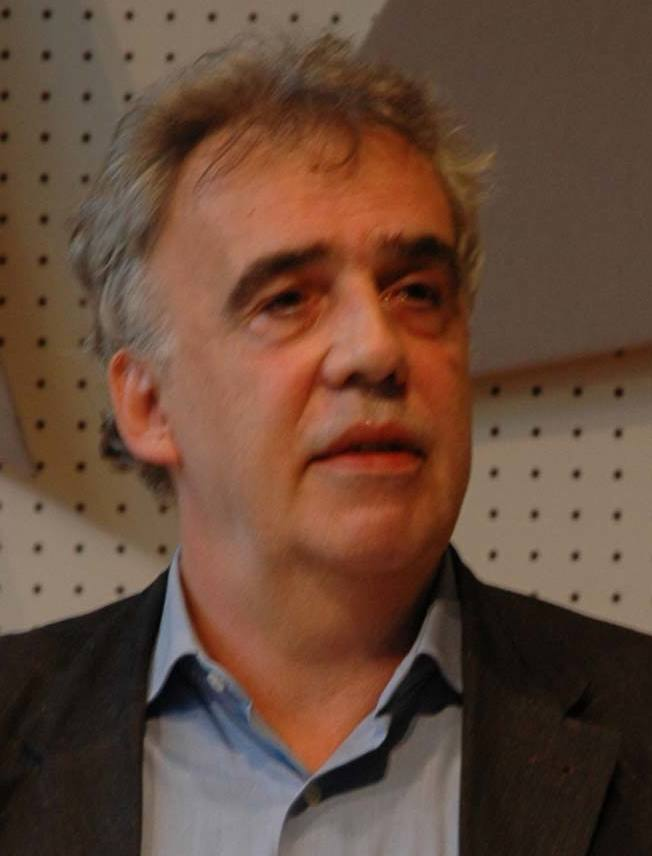
	First party	Second party
Leader	Franz Vranitzky	Josef Riegler
Party	SPÖ	ÖVP
Last election	43.12%, 80 seats	41.29%, 77 seats
Seats won	80	60
Seat change	0	▼17
Popular vote	2,012,787	1,508,600
Percentage	42.78%	32.06%
Swing	▼0.34pp	▼9.23pp
	Third party	Fourth party
Leader	Jörg Haider	Johannes Voggenhuber
Party	FPÖ	Greens
Last election	9.73%, 18 seats	4.82%, 8 seats
Seats won	33	10
Seat change	▲15	▲2
Popular vote	782,648	225,084
Percentage	16.63%	4.78%
Swing	▲6.90pp	▼0.04pp
Chancellor before election
Franz Vranitzky
SPÖ
Elected Chancellor
Franz Vranitzky
SPÖ

Parliamentary elections were held in Austria on 7 October 1990. The Social Democratic Party won the most seats, and retained the grand coalition with the Austrian People's Party. Voter turnout was 86%.

== Results ==
Party	Votes	%	Seats	+/–
Socialist Party of Austria	2,012,787	42.78	80	0
Austrian People's Party	1,508,600	32.06	60	–17
Freedom Party of Austria	782,648	16.63	33	+15
Green Alternative–Freda Meissner-Blau List	225,084	4.78	10	+2
United Greens of Austria	92,277	1.96	0	0
Alliance of Welfare Beneficiaries	35,833	0.76	0	New
Communist Party of Austria	25,682	0.55	0	0
Christian Electoral Community	9,263	0.20	0	New
Christian Democratic Party	6,194	0.13	0	New
Grey Austrians' Election Platform	3,996	0.08	0	New
Fritz Georg	2,530	0.05	0	New
Total	4,704,894	100.00	183	0
Valid votes	4,704,894	97.03		
Invalid/blank votes	143,847	2.97		
Total votes	4,848,741	100.00		
Registered voters/turnout	5,628,912	86.14		
Source: Nohlen & Stöver

=== Results by state ===
State	SPÖ	ÖVP	FPÖ	GRÜNE	Others
Burgenland	49.9	35.4	11.1	2.5	1.1
Carinthia	46.1	18.5	30.3	3.0	2.1
Lower Austria	42.5	39.1	12.2	3.3	2.9
Upper Austria	42.0	33.3	16.0	4.1	4.5
Salzburg	37.8	32.1	20.5	7.3	2.2
Styria	43.3	33.2	16.8	3.9	2.7
Tyrol	30.5	40.7	17.1	6.3	5.3
Vorarlberg	28.8	40.4	17.2	5.2	8.4
Vienna	50.7	21.1	15.7	7.6	4.9
Austria	42.8	32.1	16.6	4.8	3.7
Source: Institute for Social Research and Consulting (SORA)
