= Leonore Gewessler =

Austrian politician (born 1977)

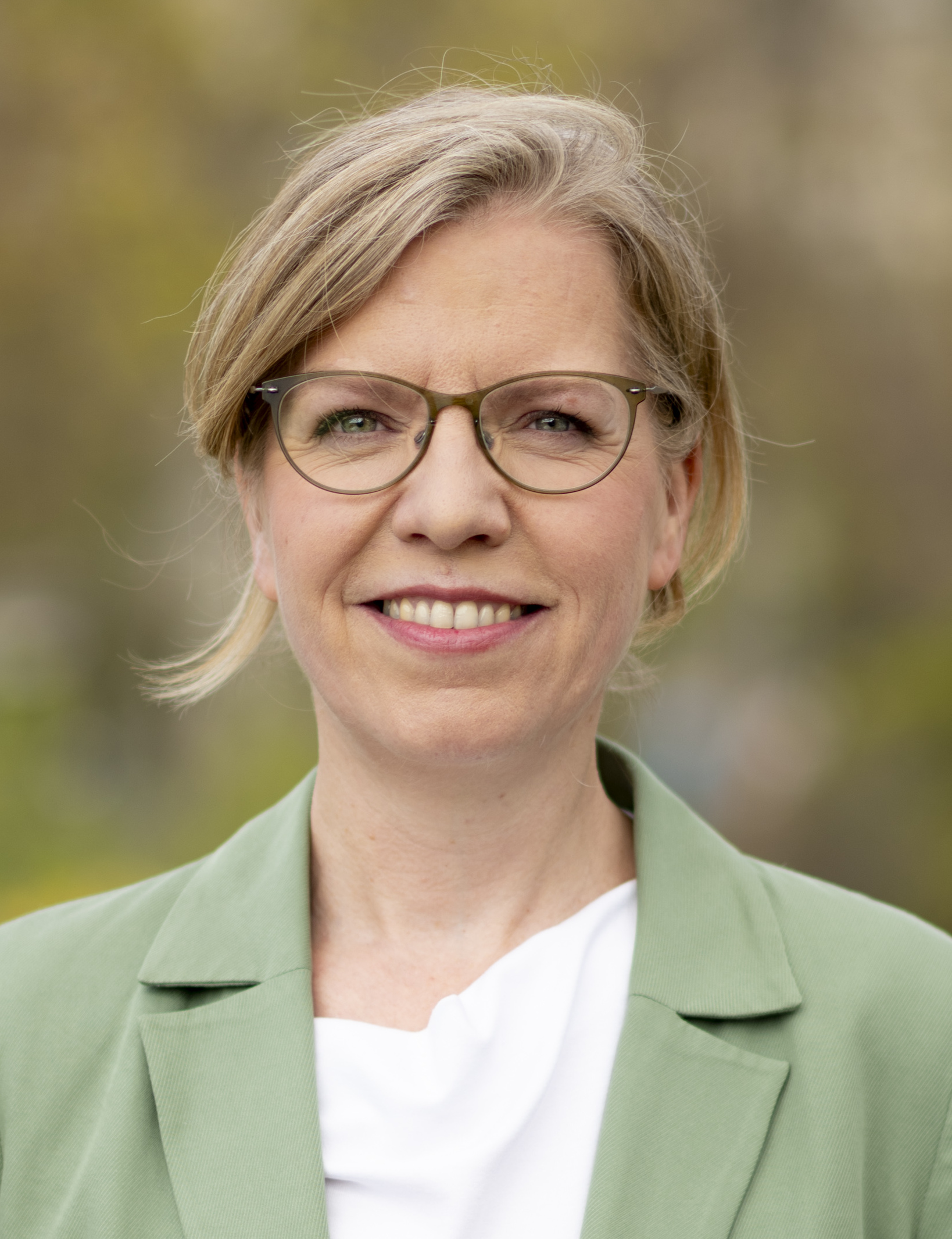
- Gewessler in 2025

Chairwoman of the Austrian Green Party
- Incumbent
- Assumed office 29 June 2025
- Preceded by: Werner Kogler

Minister for Climate Action, Environment, Energy, Mobility, Innovation and Technology
- In office 7 January 2020 – 3 March 2025
- President: Alexander Van der Bellen
- Chancellor: Sebastian Kurz; Alexander Schallenberg; Karl Nehammer
- Preceded by: Andreas Reichhardt
- Succeeded by: Peter Hanke

Member of the National Council
- Incumbent
- Assumed office 24 October 2024
- In office 23 October 2019 – 7 January 2020
- Affiliation: The Greens

Personal details
- Born: 15 September 1977 (age 49) Graz, Styria, Austria
- Party: The Greens – The Green Alternative
- Education: University of Vienna

Leonore Gewessler (German: [lɛoˈnoːʁε ˈgeːvεslɐ]; born 15 September 1977) is an Austrian Green politician who served as Minister for Climate Action, Environment, Energy, Mobility, Innovation and Technology in the Nehammer government.

On 29 June 2025, she was elected as the new Green Party leader with 96.76% of the delegates at a Green Party convention in Vienna.

== Early life and education ==
Gewessler earned a political science degree (MA) from the University of Vienna.

== Political career ==
From 2014 until 2019, Gewessler served as head of Austria's largest environmental charity and lobbying group Global 2000. In this capacity, she championed a popular campaign against the expansion of the ageing Soviet-era Mochovce Nuclear Power Plant in neighbouring Slovakia, just 100 km from the Austrian border. In the negotiations on a coalition government following the 2019 Austrian legislative election, Gewessler was a member of the Green Party's delegation.

In 2022, the Austrian government filed a legal challenge to prevent the European Union from including nuclear energy as a category of green investment. Leonore Gewessler said the categorization was "greenwashing." Defenders of the categorization see nuclear energy, which produces low carbon emissions relative to many energy sources, as key to reducing greenhouse-gas emissions.

=== Role in the passing of the Nature Restoration Law ===
On 17 June 2024, Gewessler played a pivotal role in the passage of the European Union's Nature Restoration Law, a key element of the European Green Deal aimed at restoring 20% of the EU's land and sea by the end of the decade. Despite significant opposition, including a joint statement by Austria's federal states against the law, Gewessler announced her support for it, citing her inability to reconcile letting the opportunity pass without having tried everything. This decision, however, placed her in a contentious legal grey area due to opposition from most Austrian federal states and her coalition partners, the centre-right Austrian People's Party (ÖVP).

After Gewessler's vote, the Austrian People's Party filed a lawsuit against her, accusing her of malfeasance in office and announced a complaint with the European Court of Justice (ECJ) to render Gewessler's vote of the law void. Although the impact of an ECJ complaint was questionable, a conviction for malfeasance in office could carry a sentence of imprisonment of up to 10 years.
