= Madeleine Petrovic =

Austrian politician (born 1956)

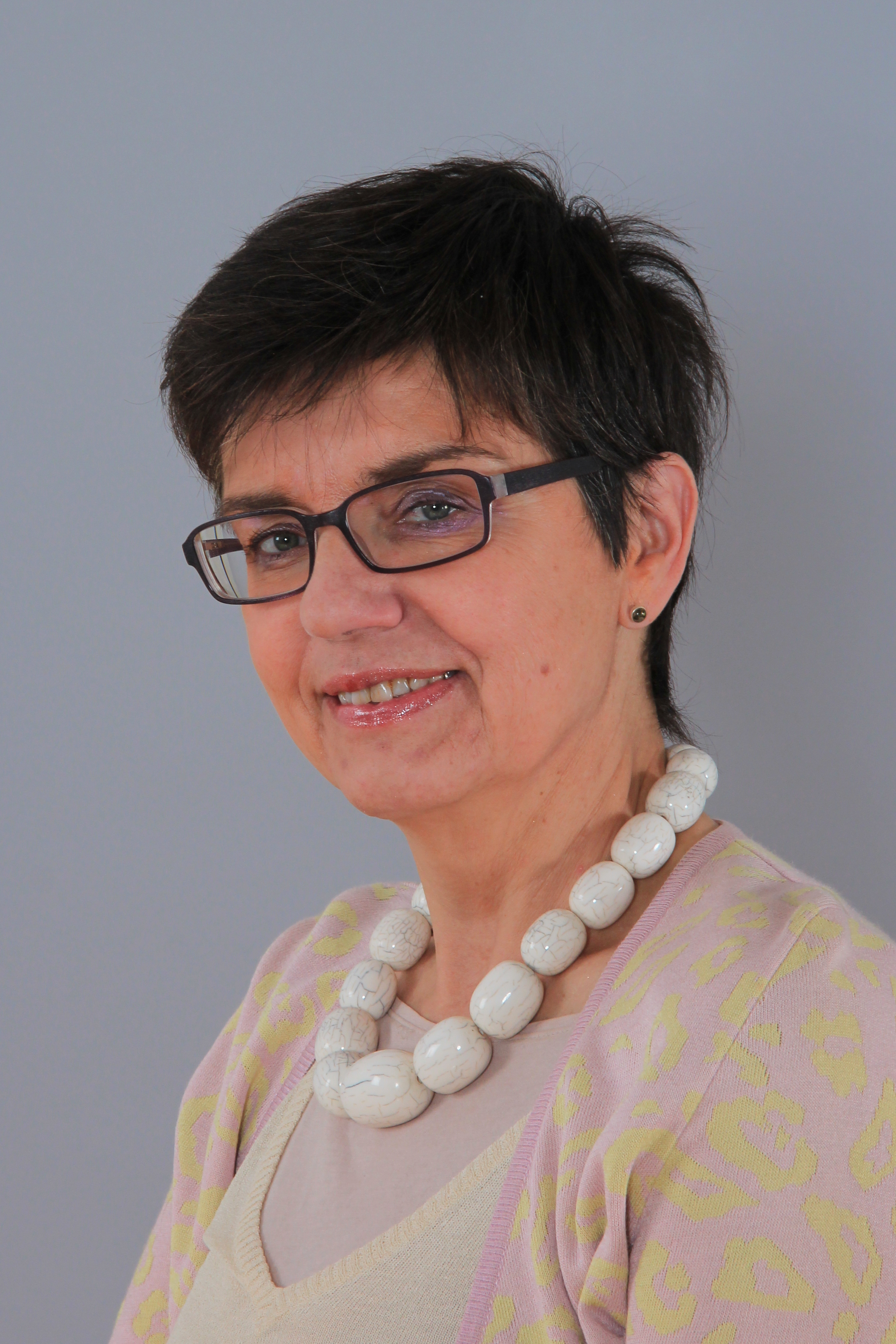
- Petrovic in 2013

Leader of Madeleine Petrovic List
- Incumbent
- Assumed office 14 May 2024
- Preceded by: Position created

Spokeswoman of the Green Party
- In office 1994 – March 1996
- Preceded by: Peter Pilz
- Succeeded by: Christoph Chorherr

Personal details
- Born: Madeleine Demand; 25 June 1956 (age 70) Vienna, Austria
- Party: Madeleine Petrovic List (since 2024)
- Other political affiliations: Green Party (until 2024)
- Website: www.tierschutz-austria.at

Madeleine Petrovic (née Demand; born 25 June 1956) is an Austrian politician. From 1994 to 1996, she was federal spokesperson of the Austrian Green Party.

== Biography ==
=== Early life ===
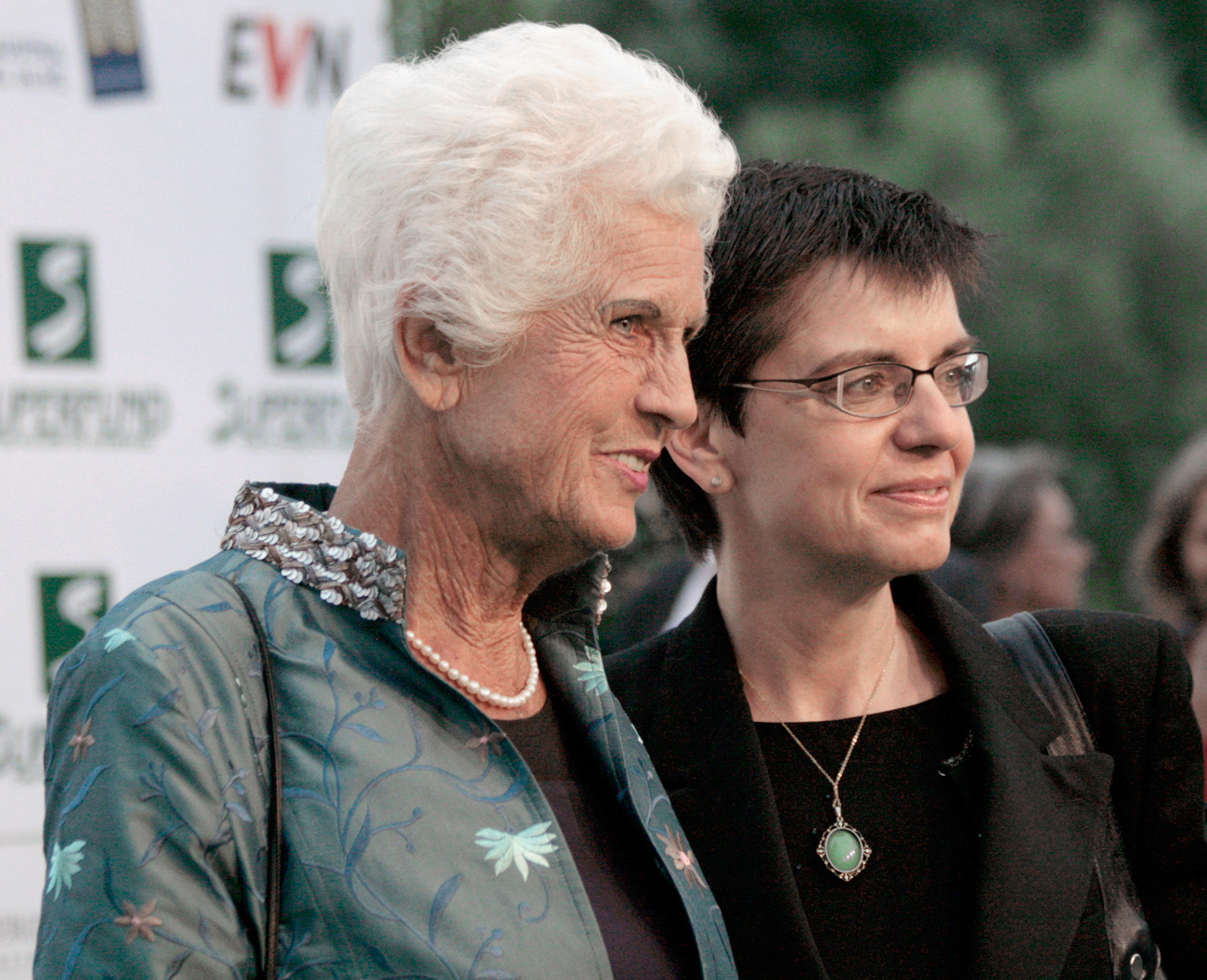
Petrovic (right) and Freda Meissner-Blau (left) at the 2009 Save The World Awards

She attended Austrian gymnasium which she finished 1974, and studied law at the University of Vienna, finishing in 1978. She then studied management science at the Vienna University of Economics and Business Administration, finishing in 1982. She received an additional diploma as certified interpreter for English and French.

After working as assistant and lector at the university, she was employed by the Ministry of Social Affairs.

During the first mailbomb series of Austrian terrorist Franz Fuchs, on 5 December 1993, a mailbomb targeted at her was discovered and neutralized. The same day Vienna's mayor Helmut Zilk was seriously injured by another mailbomb.

== Political career ==
=== Greens ===
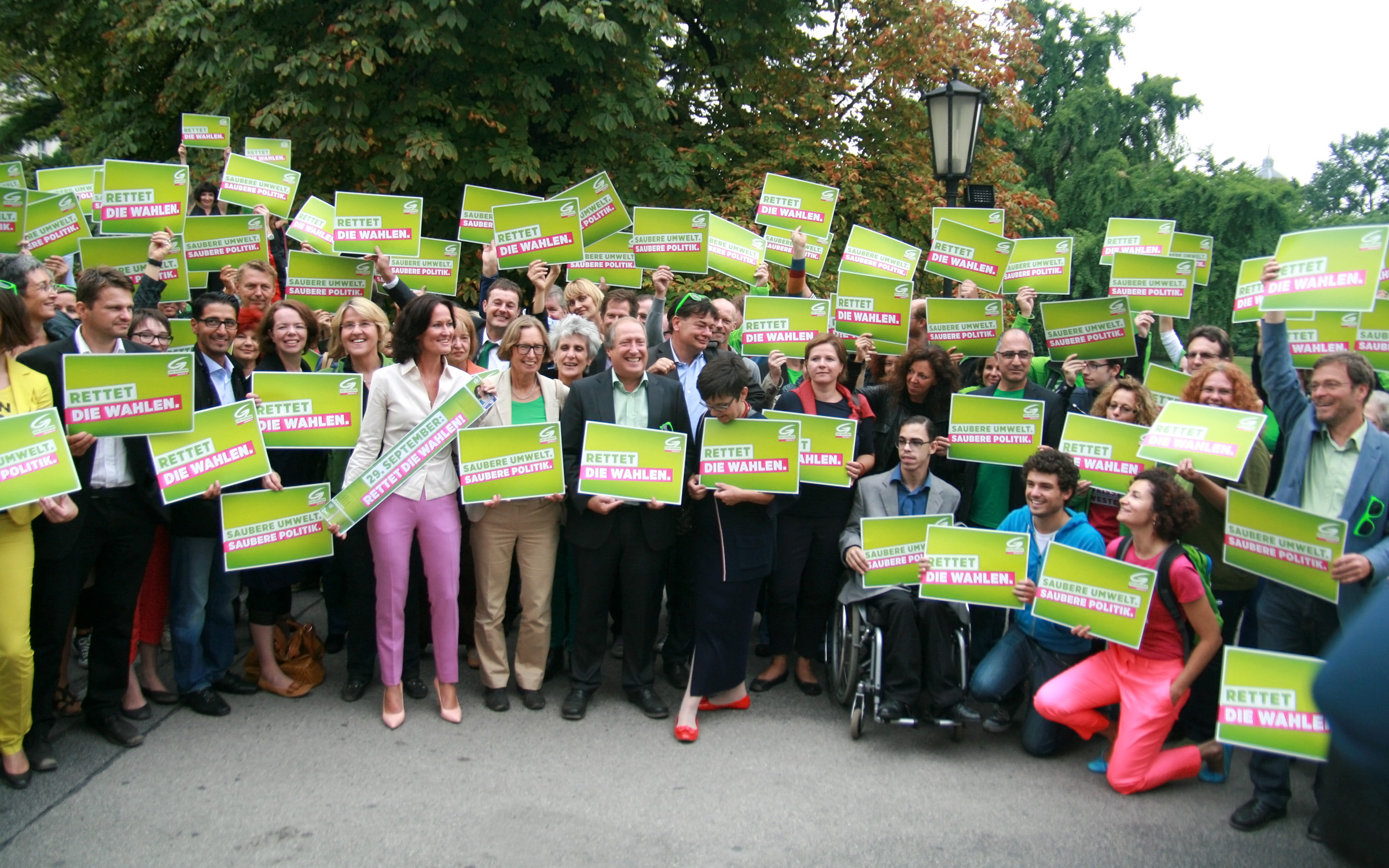
Petrovic (11th right) and Green leadership campaigning for the 2013 Austrian legislative election

From 1986 to 1987 Petrovic was politically engaged in the Döbling Greens. 1987 she became federal state chairwoman of the Vienna Greens. In 1990 she became Member of the National Council of Austria (Nationalrat). In 1994 and 1995 she was leading candidate during the campaign to the National Council elections. From 1994 to 1996 she was federal spokesperson of the Austrian Greens. Until 1999 she was chairwoman of the parliamentary club of the Greens in the national council. From 2001 to 2015 she was vice-spokesperson for the Austrian Greens. Petrovic additionally served as the state spokeswoman of the Lower Austria party branch for 13 years.

=== Independent ===
In early 2024 she announced her intention to run on her own platform in the upcoming general elections. On 14 May 2024, Petrovic officially formed her own party, the Madeleine Petrovic List with the majority of her party's members being former members of the Greens and members of the association "Greens for Fundamental Rights and Freedom of Information" (German: Grüne für Grundrechte und Informationsfreiheit; GGI). previously known as the "Greens against Compulsory Vaccination & 2G" (German: Grüne gegen Impfpflicht & 2G).

Petrovic announced her intention that her list plans to participate in the 2024 Austrian legislative election announcing they collected all 2,600 signatures to participate in the elections in August. During campaigning, Petrovic made headlines when she openly criticized the Greens for revising its bylaws to encode coronavirus precautions into party law.
