= Christoph Chorherr =

Austrian politician

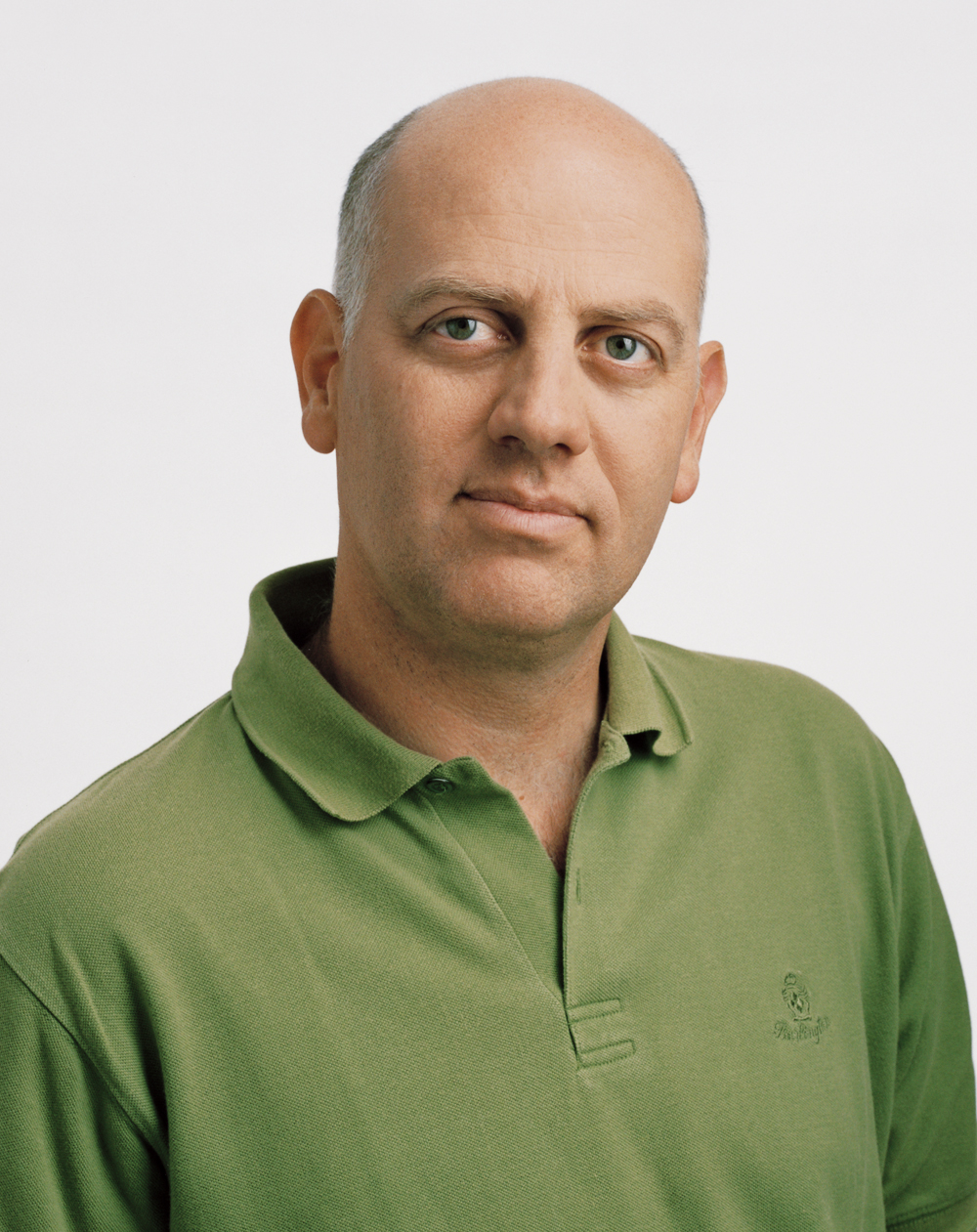

Spokesman of the Green Party
- In office March 1996 – December 1997
- Preceded by: Madeleine Petrovic
- Succeeded by: Alexander Van der Bellen

Personal details
- Born: 9 December 1960 (age 65) Vienna, Austria
- Party: Green Party
- Website: Official website

Christoph Chorherr (born 9 December 1960, Vienna) is an Austrian politician. From 1996 until December 1997 he was federal spokesperson of the Austrian Green Party.

From 1979-86 he studied economics at the Vienna University of Economics and Business Administration, specialising in environmental economics. In 1991 he became a member of the federal state council of Vienna for the Austrian Greens. He was federal spokesperson of the party from 1996 until December 1997, after which he retreated from federal politics and went back to lead Vienna's federal state party politics. He teaches at the Vienna University of Economics and Business Administration.

Chorherr is founder and head of two NGOs:

- "S²arch - Social Sustainable Architecture" which operates aid projects in South Africa
- "Ithuba Skills College"
