= Ingrid Felipe =

Austrian politician from the Green Party

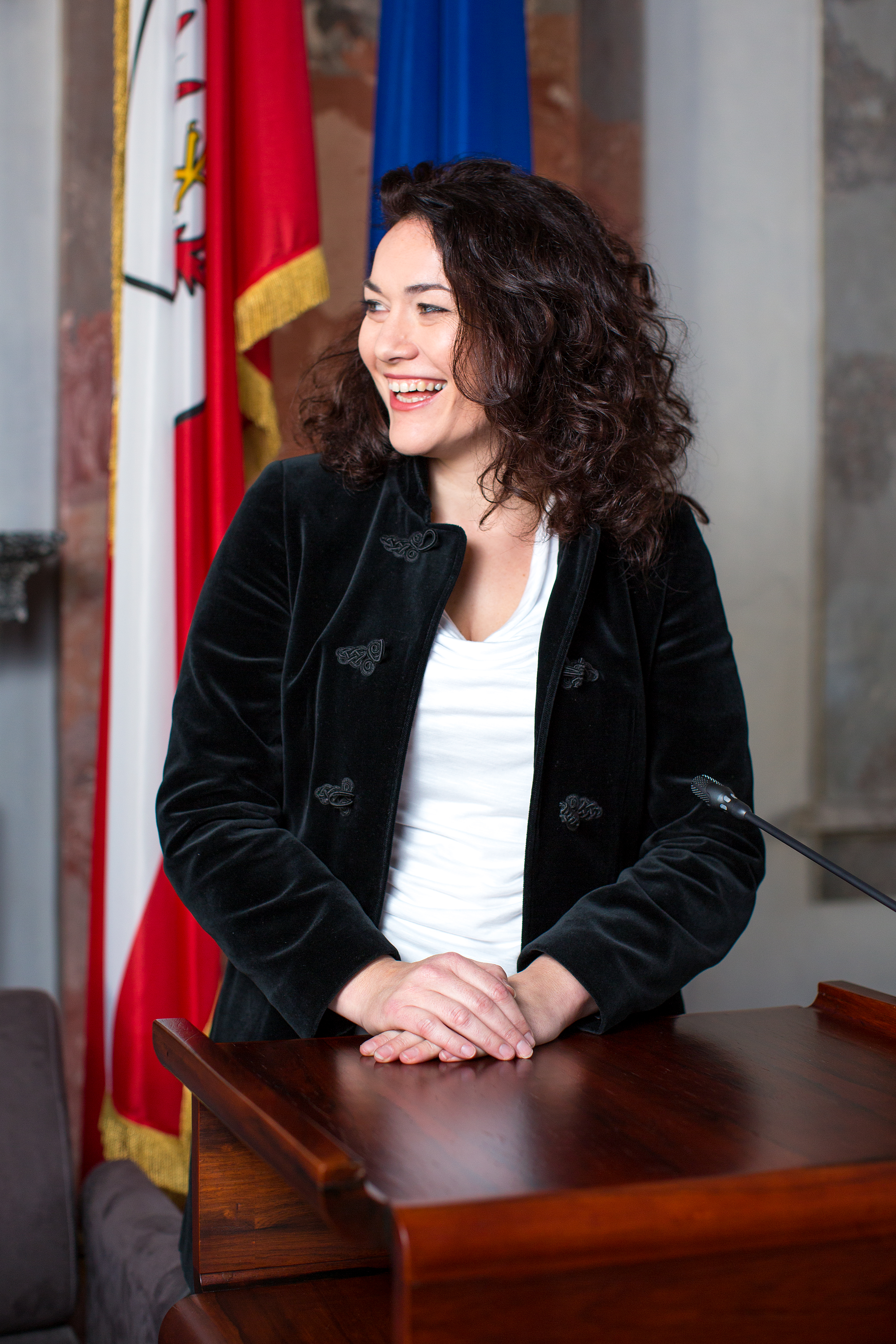

Spokeswoman of the Green Party
- In office 26 June 2017 – 17 October 2017
- Preceded by: Eva Glawischnig-Piesczek
- Succeeded by: Werner Kogler

Personal details
- Born: Ingrid Felipe Saint Hilaire; 22 August 1978 (age 47); Hall, Tyrol, Austria
- Political party: Green Party

Ingrid Felipe (born 22 August 1978) is an Austrian businesswoman and former politician from the Green Party. She was second deputy Governor of Tyrol from May 2013 until October 2022 and from June to October 2017, she served as federal spokeswoman of her party.

== Biographical details ==
Ingrid Felipe grew up in Rum and, from 1984 to 1988, went to the Volksschule there. From 1988 to 1992, she visited the Hauptschule Kettenbrücke Innsbruck. In 1997, she graduated from the Handelsakademie in Innsbruck. Subsequently, Ingrid Felipe began to study business administration at the University of Innsbruck. Besides this, she was also involved in handball in Innsbruck, initially as an active player, later also as a functionary or project manager for various events. From 1994 onwards, she also worked as a waitress and catering employee, and from 2002 onwards, as an assistant to the management in restaurants, and continued this activity after gaining her degree in 2003. From 2006 to 2012, Ingrid Felipe worked as an office manager at the Parson architectural office.

== Political career ==
It was already evident during her school years that Felipe would pursue a political career. When she was in elementary school, she and her sister got the church to agree that in their parish of Rum, they were allowed to act as servers in the church, even though they were girls. In 1994 and 1995, she was elected as a school spokesperson for the Handelsakademie and Handelsschule Innsbruck. In 1995, she became a teacher of higher education in Tyrol.

She began her partisan political career in 2005 as a financial representative of the Greens in Tyrol, which she held until January 2010. In addition, she was a substitute delegate of the Enlarged Federal Executive Committee (EBV) of the Greens from 2007 to 2009. From 2009 to 2013, Ingrid Felipe was Regional Spokesperson for the Green Alternative Tyrol and, since 13 March 2010, also as a member of the city council of Rum. In February 2009, June 2010 and March 2012, among other things, she was the substitute of the provincial representatives Christine Baur and Maria Scheiber in meetings of the Tyrolean Landtag.

Ingrid Felipe first attracted a wide public attention by protesting against the expulsion of the then 20-year-old, Lamin Jaithe, who had been living in Tyrol for years, in May 2011.

On 1 May 2012 she was elected to the Landtag to replace the outgoing member of the Landtag Maria Scheiber.

On 24 May 2013, she was elected Provincial Minister for the following departments by the Tyrolean Landtag:

- Environmental and climate protection (without prejudice to the competence of the other members of the regional governments in the relevant areas); Environmental testing;
- Nature Conservation; Mountain Rescue;
- Waste management; All legal proceedings relating to waste disposal facilities; Chemicals legislation;
- European transport policy; Legal and technical matters relating to motor vehicles and railways, aeronautics and shipping; Road Administration Law; Road Police;
- Road services; Transport connections, including the shareholdings of the Land in Verkehrsverbund Tirol GmbH;
- Sustainability coordination.

In addition, she was elected as the second deputy of the Landeshauptmann, and is therefore the first member of the Tyrolean Greens and the second woman in this office.

On 19 February 2016, she was elected deputy party chairman of the Austrian Greens. She is thus the successor of Maria Vassilakou, who previously resigned. At the extraordinary congress in Linz, she was officially elected on 25 June 2017, with 93.7% of the votes. However, she did not lead her party as the top candidate in the national elections. Ulrike Lunacek, who was also confirmed in Linz with 96.5%, was the leading candidate instead.

After the National Council election, which ended in October 2017 with her party being voted out from the parliament, Felipe resigned from her function as chairwoman of the Greens two days later.

== Post-political career ==
In December 2022, Ingrid Felipe was appointed to the board of directors of the German (then-)railway infrastructure manager DB Netz. Upon the merger of DB Netz and DB Station&Service into DB InfraGO, Felipe became the head of its Infrastructure Planning and Projects department.

== Personal life ==
Ingrid Felipe lives as a single mother with her son in Rum.
