= Alexander Van der Bellen =

President of Austria since 2017

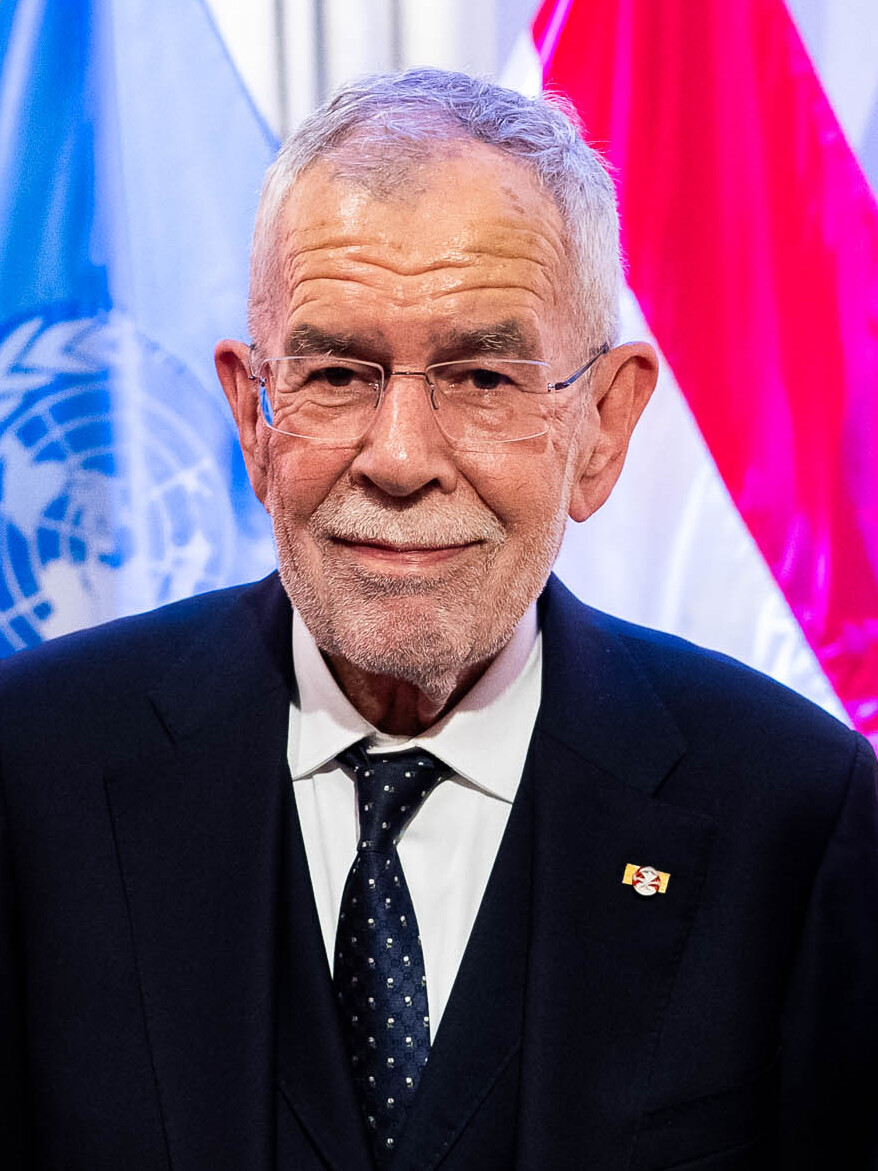
- Van der Bellen in 2025

President of Austria
- Incumbent
- Assumed office 26 January 2017
- Chancellor: See list: Christian Kern; Sebastian Kurz; Brigitte Bierlein; Alexander Schallenberg; Karl Nehammer; Christian Stocker
- Preceded by: Heinz Fischer

Spokesman of the Green Party
- In office 13 December 1997 – 3 October 2008
- Preceded by: Christoph Chorherr
- Succeeded by: Eva Glawischnig

Member of the National Council
- In office 7 November 1994 – 5 July 2012
- Nominated by: Peter Pilz
- Affiliation: Green Party

Personal details
- Born: 18 January 1944 (age 82) Greater Vienna, Alpine and Danube Reichsgaue, Greater German Reich (now Vienna, Austria)
- Citizenship: Estonian (1944–1958); Austrian (1958–present)
- Party: Independent (2016–present)
- Other political affiliations: Social Democratic Party (before 1992); Greens (1992–2016)
- Spouses: Brigitte Hüttner (m. 1962; div. 2015) Doris Schmidauer (m. 2015)
- Children: 2
- Relatives: Van der Bellen family
- Education: University of Innsbruck (Dr. rer. oec.)
- Profession: Politician; economist; university professor
- Awards: List of honours and awards
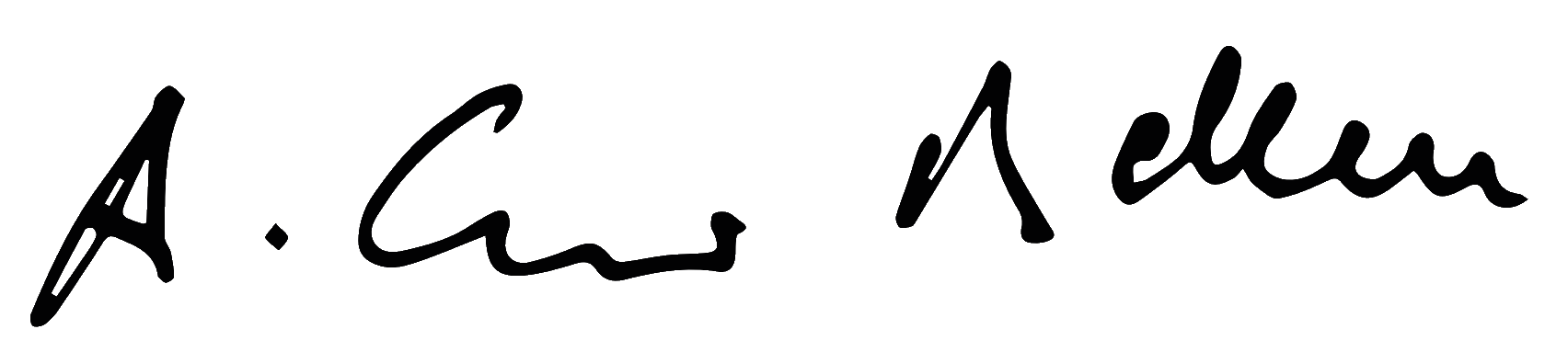
- Signature
- Website: Presidential chancellery

Alexander "Sascha" Van der Bellen (Note: German pronunciation: [alɛkˈsandɐ fan deːɐ̯ ˈbɛlən]) (born 18 January 1944), also referred to by the abbreviation VdB, is an Austrian politician serving as the president of Austria since 2017. He was previously a professor of economics at the University of Vienna, and after joining politics, the spokesman of the Austrian Green Party.

Van der Bellen was born in Austria to Russian and Estonian parents who were refugees from the recently occupied Estonia, and he became a naturalized citizen of Austria together with his parents in 1958. He is a descendant of the former Russian Empire's aristocratic Van der Bellen family of patrilineal Dutch ancestry dating back to the 18th century.

He was a member of the National Council representing the Green Party there from 1994 to 2012, and served as leader of the party as well as its parliamentary group.

He ran as a nominally independent candidate supported by the Greens in the 2016 presidential election, and finished second out of six in the first round before winning the second round against Norbert Hofer, a member of the Freedom Party. On 1 July, before he was due to be sworn into office, the results of the second round of voting were annulled by the Constitutional Court due to absentee votes being improperly counted too early, requiring the election to be re-held. On 4 December 2016, he won the ensuing election, taking approximately 54% of the vote.

Van der Bellen has described himself as a centrist liberal, and supports green and social liberal policies. As discussed in his 2015 book, he is supportive of the European Union and advocates European federalism. During the presidential election, he appealed to the political centre and was endorsed by the leaders of both the Social Democratic Party and the conservative People's Party. Van der Bellen is the second Green president of a European Union country (after Raimonds Vējonis of Latvia) and the first to be directly elected by popular vote.

== Personal life ==
=== Origin and youth ===
In the 18th century, Van der Bellen's patrilineal ancestors emigrated from the Netherlands to the Russian Empire. During the Russian Civil War (1917–1922) part of his family escaped from the Bolsheviks and migrated to the newly independent Estonia. Before this, Van der Bellen's grandfather Aleksander von der Bellen served as head of the civilian regional government in Pskov. In Estonia, the family changed its name from von der Bellen to Van der Bellen. In 1931, Van der Bellen's father Alexander married his Estonian mother, Alma Sieboldt in Kihelkonna, Saaremaa, Estonia. Subsequently, his father obtained Estonian citizenship as well. In 1940, Estonia was invaded, occupied and annexed by the Soviet Union. In February or March 1941, Van der Bellen's father, mother, and older sister Vivian-Diana moved to Nazi Germany; in line with the German–Soviet Frontier Treaty they were accepted as the so-called Volksdeutsche.

Via Lauksargiai (former Laugszargen, Memelland) and a German resettlement camp in Werneck at Würzburg, Van der Bellen's parents moved to Vienna, where their son Alexander was born in 1944 and baptized into the Lutheran Church. As the Red Army approached Vienna, the family escaped to the Kauner valley in Tyrol, where his father later became active as a businessman again.

In 1954, after completing primary school in Innsbruck, Van der Bellen switched to the Academic Grammar School Innsbruck (Akademisches Gymnasium Innsbruck), where he took his Matura in 1962. Until this time Van der Bellen had Estonian citizenship like his parents; he obtained Austrian citizenship around 1958. According to Van der Bellen, he did not complete mandatory service in the Austrian Armed Forces. He underwent the medical examination for military service twice, the first one resulting in him being rated unfit (untauglich). However, he successfully passed the second one. Later, he received several respites during his studies and due to his marriage. After that Van der Bellen was no longer summoned for service, due to his subsequent professorship.

=== Education ===
Van der Bellen studied economics at the University of Innsbruck and obtained a master's degree in 1966. With his dissertation Kollektive Haushalte und gemeinwirtschaftliche Unternehmungen: Probleme ihrer Koordination ("Collective households and public-service enterprises: Problems of their coordination") he was awarded the title of Dr. rer. oec (doctor rerum oeconomicarum) in 1970. From 1968 to 1971 he served as scientific assistant to Clemens August Andreae at the Institute for Public Finance at the University of Innsbruck, and from 1972 to 1974 as a research fellow at the Berlin Social Science Center (WZB). He was university assistant at the Institute for Public Finance at the University of Innsbruck and was awarded the qualification as university lecturer (habilitation) in 1975. He established friendship with Turkish economist Murat R. Sertel, with whom he worked on decision and preference theories and later on published several articles and discussion papers.

In 1976 Van der Bellen became associate professor at the University of Innsbruck, where he remained until 1980. During this time he moved to Vienna to study and research from 1977 to 1980 at the Federal Academy of Public Administration. From 1980 to 1999 he was extraordinary university professor for economics at the University of Vienna. Between 1990 and 1994 he there also became dean of the faculty for economics at University of Vienna. In October 1999 he became parliamentary leader of the Greens in the National Council and thus resigned as university professor in January 2009. Van der Bellen retired in February 2009.

Van der Bellen's research focused on planning and financing procedures in the public sector, infrastructure financing, fiscal policy, public expenditure, government regulation policy, public undertakings, and environmental and transport policy. He has published in professional journals such as the Die Betriebswirtschaft, Econometrica, Journal of Economic Theory, Österreichische Zeitschrift für Politikwissenschaft, Public Choice, Wirtschaftspolitische Blätter and the Zeitschrift für öffentliche und gemeinwirtschaftliche Unternehmen.

=== Family ===
Van der Bellen married when he was 18 years old and became a father for the first time at 19. His relationship with Brigitte (born Hüttner, 1943–2018) lasted over 50 years, until they divorced in 2015. He had two sons with her. Since December 2015 Van der Bellen has been married to a longtime friend and managing director of the Greens Club, Doris Schmidauer. He lives in Vienna and in Kaunertal, Tyrol.

=== Religion ===
As a young man Van der Bellen left the Lutheran Church, because he was upset about his local pastor. According to his own words he does not believe in the one God, but in a "message or vision" ("Botschaft oder Vision"), which in his view the New Testament states. However, in an interview in 2019 he stated, that he had rejoined the Protestant Church of the Augsburg Confession the same year.

=== Freemason ===
According to his own statement, Van der Bellen joined the only existing Freemason chapter in Innsbruck at the time, although he participated at meetings for a year, which he described as "being active". "After that, as a purely passive member, I paid the membership fee for about 10 years and finally left on my explicit request" ("Danach habe ich als rein passives Mitglied noch etwa 10 Jahre lang den Mitgliedsbeitrag bezahlt und bin schließlich auf meinen expliziten Wunsch hin ausgeschieden"), Van der Bellen in a ZIB 2 elections interview with Armin Wolf (18 May 2016). According to Van der Bellen, he is no longer a Freemason.

=== Estonian citizenship ===
After Van der Bellen's victory in the 2016 Austrian presidential elections, President of Estonia Toomas Hendrik Ilves congratulated him. The Estonian Ministry of Foreign Affairs have stated that Van der Bellen could get back his Estonian passport at any time. This is possible because Van der Bellen's parents were citizens of Estonia as of 16 June 1940; children of such parents are automatically accepted as citizens. Urmas Paet, former foreign minister of Estonia and MEP said: "the election results are a reason to congratulate Austrians twice. For Estonia and its people, the fact that Austria has elected an Estonian citizen as its president also plays a role."

=== Nickname ===
Van der Bellen is sometimes also called "Sascha" (which is an abbreviation of his first name) by his friends, colleagues, and within his party.

== Political career ==
=== Joining politics ===
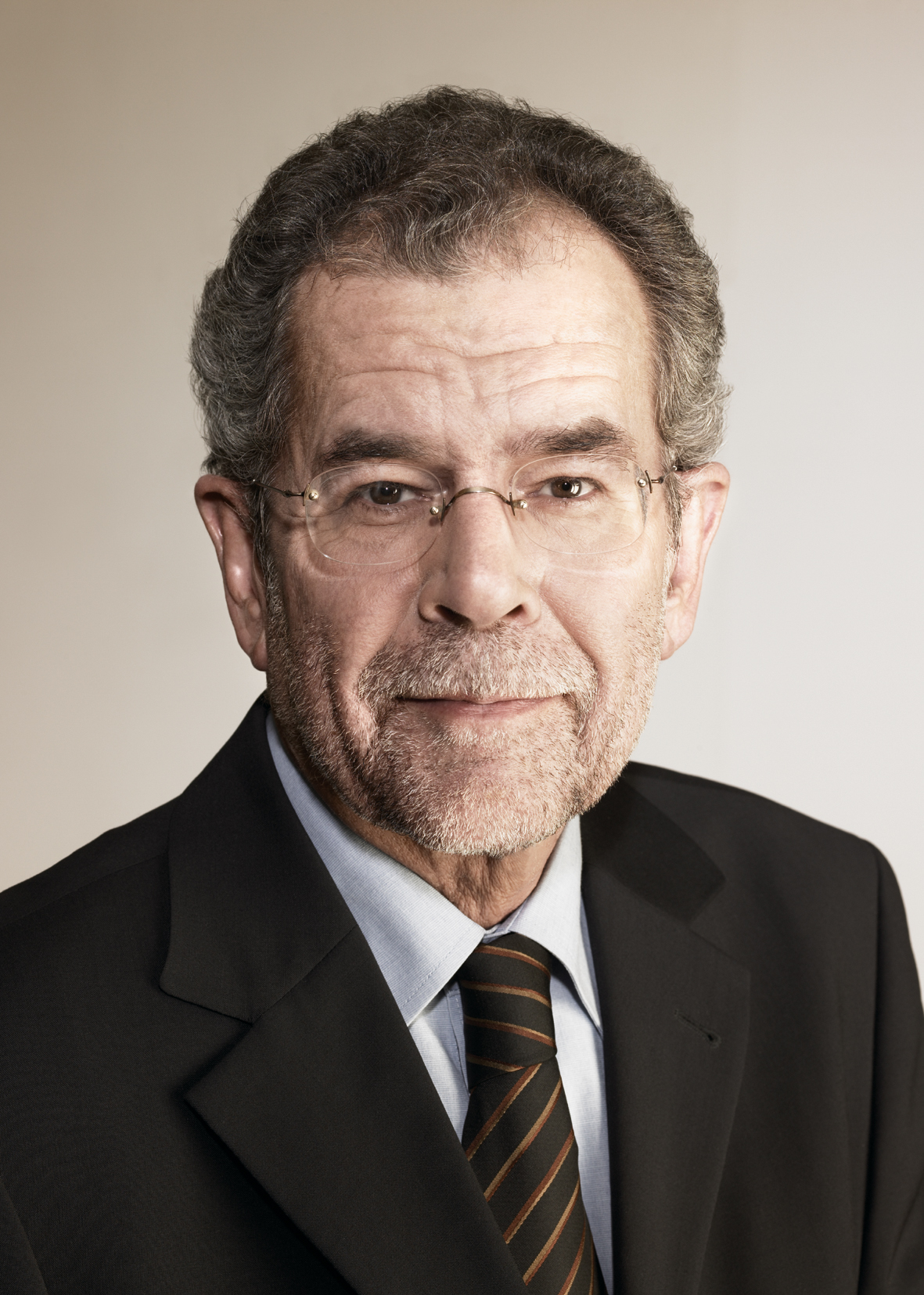
Van der Bellen in 2004

Van der Bellen was a member of the Social Democratic Party from the mid-1970s until the late 1980s, but his interests later turned towards the environmental movement. His former postgraduate Peter Pilz, back then the spokesman of the Green Party, brought Van der Bellen into his party. Van der Bellen later described these changes as a development "from an arrogant anti-capitalist to a generous left-liberal", although the latter self-image in his autobiography of 2015 also changed into a "liberal Anglo-Saxon coinage".

In 1992, Van der Bellen was nominated by the Greens for the office of the President of the Court of Audit; he was defeated by the ÖVP-close Franz Fiedler. After the Greens suffered significant losses in the 1995 legislative elections on 17 December, Van der Bellen took over the party chairmanship from Christoph Chorherr in December 1997 and remained until October 2008, being the longest-serving spokesman in the history of the Austrian Greens, with almost eleven years in office.

He assumed chairmanship with the party having 4.8% approval in polls at that time. He led the party through three elections, each higher than the last: in the 1999 legislative elections the party got 7.4% of the vote, in the 2002 legislative elections it got 9.5% of the vote, and in the 2006 legislative elections the party got 11.05% of the vote. After losses in the 2008 legislative elections, in which the Green Party's voteshare dropped to 10.11%, Van der Bellen, dubbed "the green professor" by the media, resigned on 3 October 2008 as spokesman of the Green Party. He handed over the office to the Third President of the National Council at the time, Eva Glawischnig. As designated spokesperson she was elected administrative party leader on 24 October and later officially endorsed and sworn in by the party congress (Bundeskongress).

=== Member of parliament ===
With the beginning of the XIX. legislative period on 7 November 1994 Van der Bellen functioned as a member of the National Council for the first time and held this position until 2012. During the XXIV. legislative period he dropped out of the National Council on 5 July 2012. From 1999 to 2008 he was parliamentary leader of the Green Party in the National Council.

During his time in the National Council, Van der Bellen also served as a member of the Budget, Main, Science, Financial, Industrial (as deputy chairman), Administrative and Foreign Affairs (as clerk and deputy chairman) committees as well as member of several subcommittees. In 2009–10 he was a substitute member and from 2010 to 2012 a member of the Austrian delegation to the Parliamentary Assembly of the Council of Europe in Strasbourg.

After the 2008 legislative elections, he was proposed by the Greens, who were no longer the third strongest party, as a counter-candidate to the controversial FPÖ candidate Martin Graf for the post of Third President of the National Council, however, he failed to win the vote on 28 October 2008: Graf was elected with 109 out of 156 valid votes, Van der Bellen only received 27, and the remaining 20 votes went to other MPs.

=== University commissioner ===
In February 2011, Van der Bellen was elected by the red-green city and state government as Commissioner for Universities and Research (also: Commissioner of the City of Vienna for Universities and Research, denotation in 2013).

As a university commissioner, he campaigned for the improvement of the relationship between the city of Vienna and the universities located there. At his initiative, regular meetings took place for the first time between representatives of the Viennese universities and the Municipal Department 35 (Municipal Department of the City of Vienna) in order to improve cooperation in immigration and residence matters for third-country students and researchers. The initiative was taken up by the Austrian Universities Conference – The Austrian Conference of Rectors (uniko) and extended from Vienna to the whole of Austria. On the initiative of University Commissioner Van der Bellen, the Vienna University Circle, an informal advisory board composed of rectors and vice-rectors of Viennese universities, including the research institution Institute of Science and Technology Austria (ISTA), were launched.

=== Vienna state parliament ===
At the 2010 Viennese state elections on 10 October Van der Bellen stood as a candidate on the 29th place of the list of the Vienna Greens. With the elections slogan "Go Professor go!" he reached 11,952 preferred votes and thus achieved a precedence on the first place. Although he stated in multiple interviews: "Should I get the preferential votes and it comes to a red-green government, I will definitely move into the Landtag", he still did not accept the Gemeinderat mandate after the elections and remained in the National Council til 5 July 2012.

On 14 June 2012, Van der Bellen announced in a press conference to swap from the National Council to the Vienna Gemeinderat and Landtag. On 5 July 2012 he left the National Council. The inauguration took place in September 2012 at the first Gemeinderat meeting after the summer break. In January 2015, it was announced that Van der Bellen would retreat from Vienna's municipal politics at the end of the legislative period. In the internal list election of the Vienna Greens on 14 February, after the application deadline, he did not compete in the internal party candidacy. Thus he was no longer on a selectable place on the electoral lists of the Greens in the 2015 Viennese state elections.

=== Political views ===
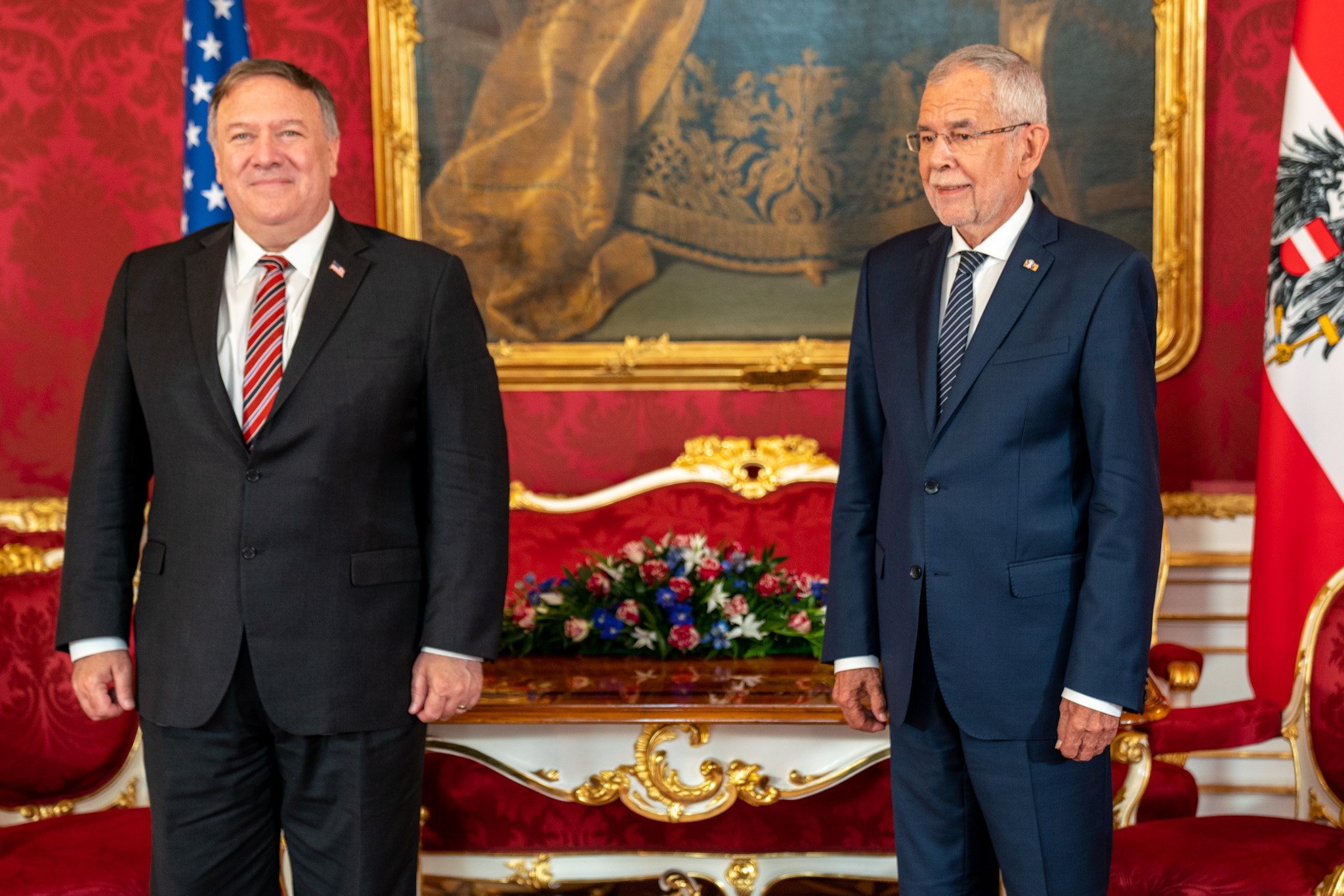
Van der Bellen meets with U.S. Secretary of State Mike Pompeo at the Hofburg Imperial Palace in Vienna on 14 August 2020.

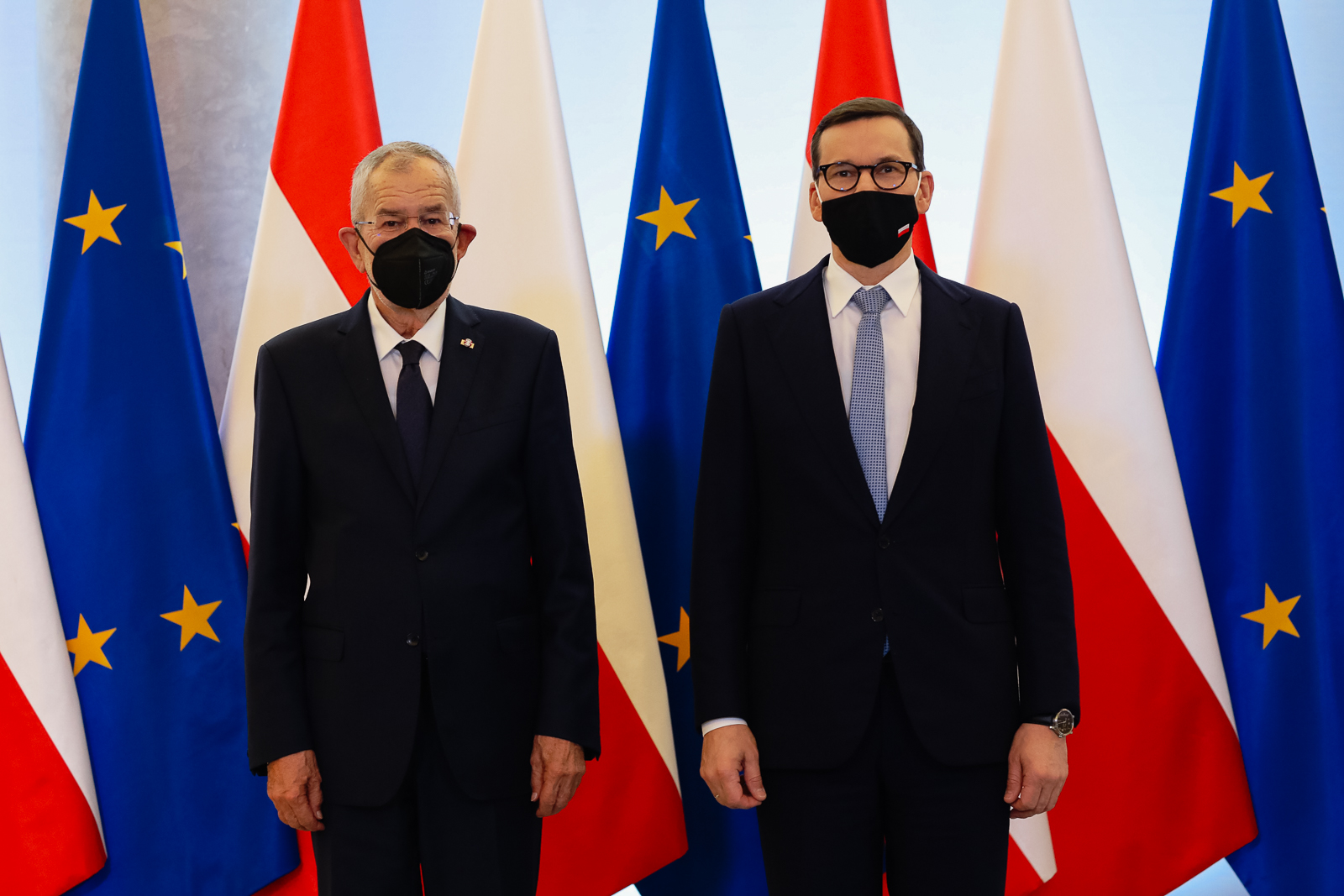
Van der Bellen with Polish Prime Minister Mateusz Morawiecki on 5 October 2021

In 2001, Van der Bellen said that he turned from an "arrogant anti-capitalist" into a "broad-minded left-liberal" over the course of his political career. In his 2015 autobiography, Van der Bellen described himself as a liberal positioned in the political centre while downplaying his earlier description as left-liberal, and said he was inspired by the Anglo-Saxon liberal tradition, particularly John Stuart Mill. He is strongly supportive of the European Union, and advocates European federalism. During the 2016 presidential election, he appealed to the political centre and used "Unser Präsident der Mitte" (Our President of the centre) for his campaign slogan.

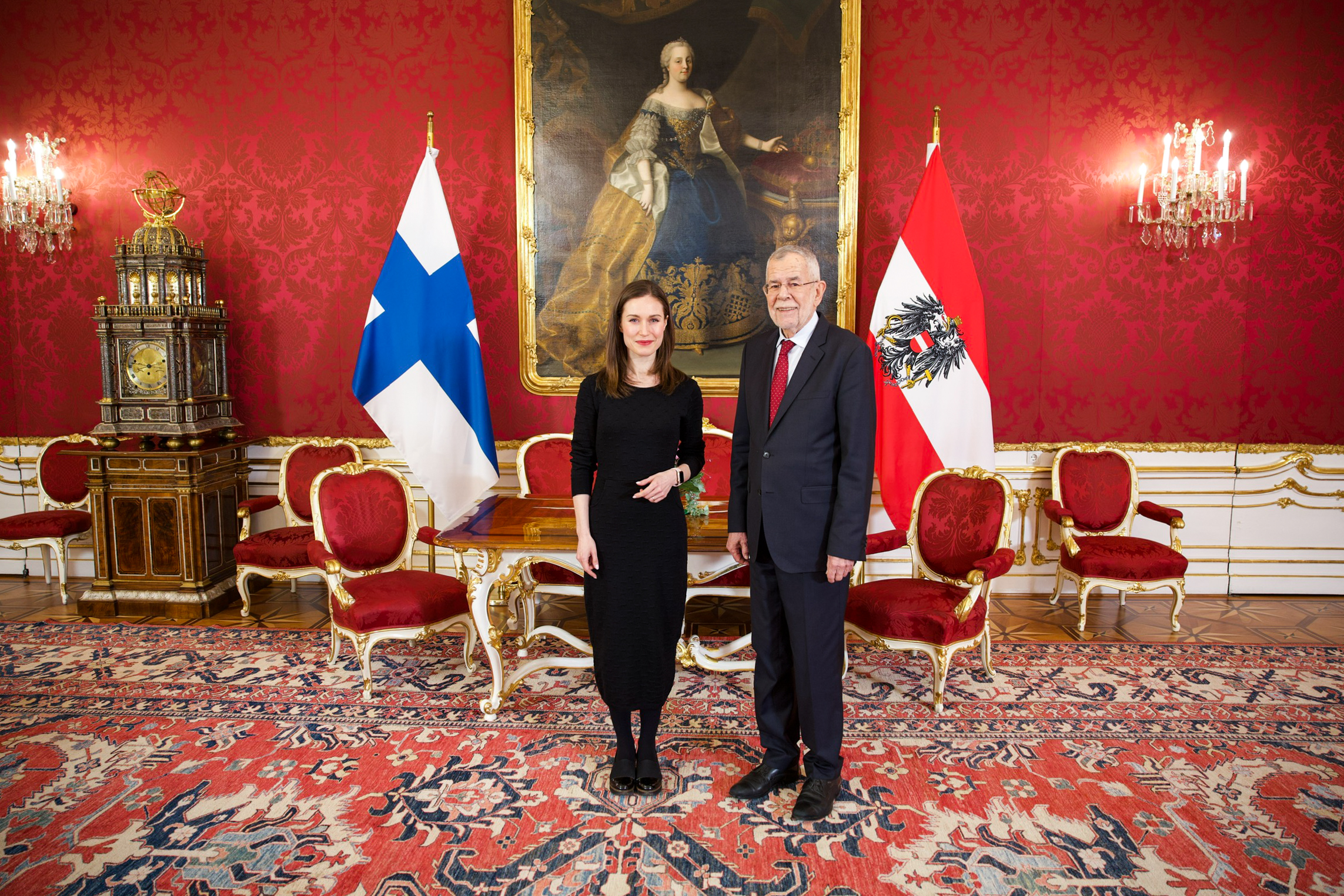
Van der Bellen with Finnish Prime Minister Sanna Marin on 17 February 2023

During the European migrant crisis, Van der Bellen has argued that Europe should accept refugees who have fled from war zones in Syria and elsewhere, and has often mentioned his own background as the son of refugees in debates. He has opposed the government's decision to impose a limit on how many asylum-seekers it will allow into Austria.

Van der Bellen has commented that due to emerging Islamophobia and prejudice against women wearing headscarves, he could foresee a day when all non-Muslim women might also be asked to wear headscarves as a sign of solidarity with women who wear them on religious grounds. The remarks were criticized widely, especially on the political right.

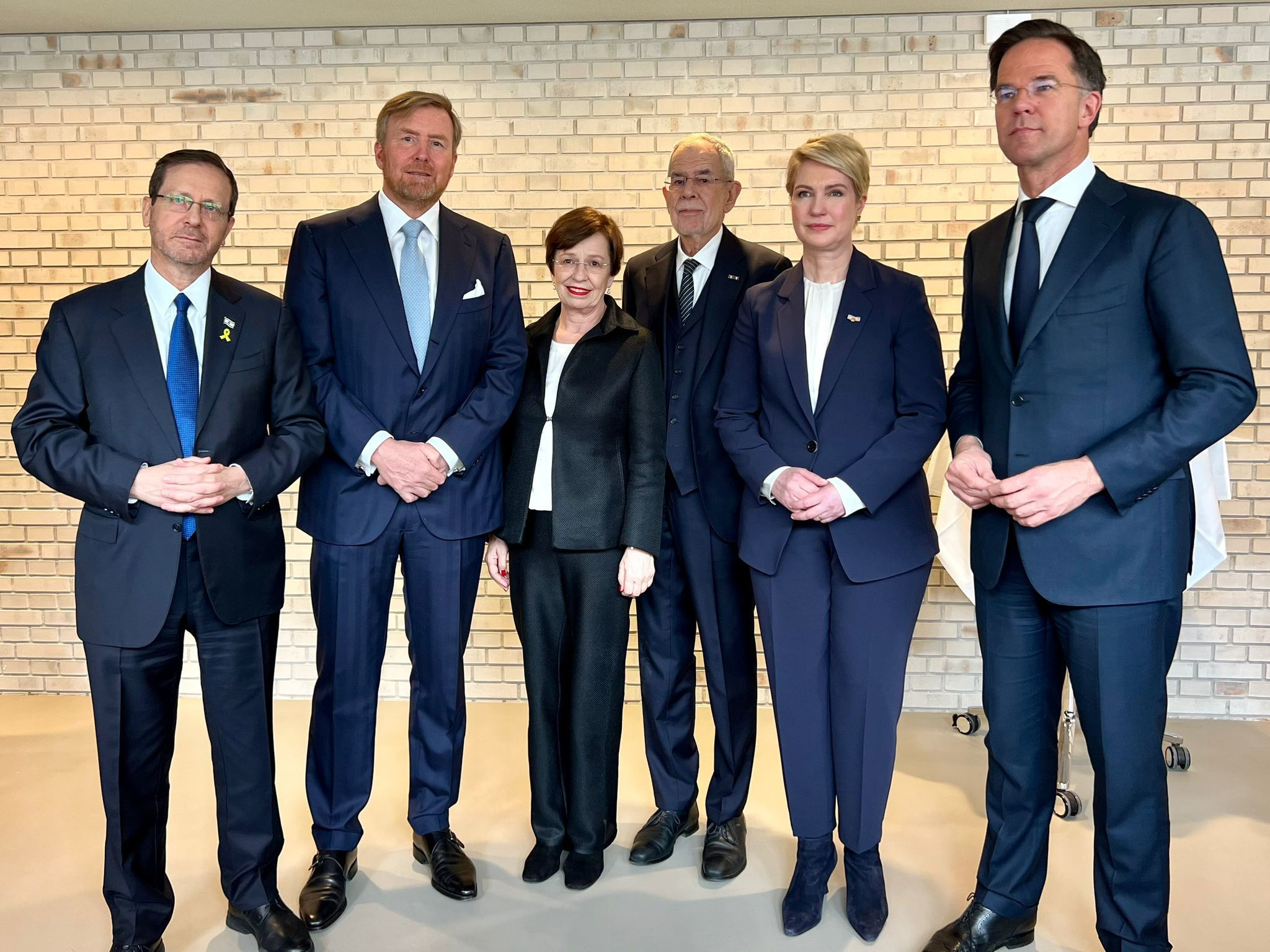
Van der Bellen with Israeli President Isaac Herzog, Dutch Prime Minister Mark Rutte and King Willem-Alexander of the Netherlands on 10 March 2024

Van der Bellen has criticized U.S. President Donald Trump, warning of the dangers of right-wing populism. He has opined that the British withdrawal from the European Union is damaging to the economies of both the United Kingdom and Europe. He is opposed to recognising the Russian annexation of Crimea. He has stated that the Austrian embassy in Israel should remain in Tel Aviv.

Van der Bellen has criticized Turkish President Recep Tayyip Erdoğan and his supporters after mass pro-Erdoğan protests by Turks in Austria, saying: "In Austria there is freedom to demonstrate as long as it is peaceful. ... Everyone that accepts the right to demonstrate, has to see that the same rights – such as freedom of speech, press freedom, independent justice system, and freedom to demonstrate are being denied in Turkey by President Erdogan."

Before the 2024 Austrian legislative election Van der Bellen pledged to ensure the formation of a government that respects the "foundations of our liberal democracy". Despite the far-right Freedom Party going on to become the largest party in Parliament, Van der Bellen asked caretaker Chancellor Karl Nehammer of the People's Party to form the next government instead, citing other parties' refusals to join a coalition with the Freedom Party. After the Nehammer-led coalition talks collapsed after several weeks Van der Bellen reversed course and asked Herbert Kickl to attempt to form a coalition government with the People's Party on 5 January 2025. After the Freedom Party also proved to be unable to form a coalition and returned the mandate to do so, the original coalition negotiations restarted and the involved parties subsequently formed a government.

== Presidential election ==
=== Before the election ===
Since August 2014 Van der Bellen had already been regarded as a presidential candidate. The Green Party reserved the domain "vdb2016.at" through the media agency Media Brothers for a possible presidential candidacy of Van der Bellen in November 2014. After its reservation the party delegated the domain to the Association "Together for Van der Bellen" as of 6 January 2016.

=== Campaign ===
On 8 January 2016, Van der Bellen officially announced his candidacy for the 2016 presidential election by video message.

Van der Bellen ran as an independent candidate and thus non-party nominee for the office of President. As the longest-serving leader of the Green party (from 1997 to 2008) and as an afterwards still active party member, Van der Bellen's claimed nonpartisanism was questioned and challenged throughout his presidential campaign. However, Van der Bellen officially suspended his party membership at the Greens as of 23 May 2016, demonstrating his willingness to strive for a nonpartisan incumbency.

Regardless of that the Green Party still supported him during his campaign; establishing the Association "Together for Van der Bellen – Independent Initiative for the 2016 Presidential Election" which comprised six employees and premises as well as 1.2 million euros financial aid. The association is headquartered within the Green Party's head office, executive director of the association is Van der Bellen's campaign manager Lothar Lockl. For the repetition of the second ballot, the association received a total of 18,398 private donations, which amounted to about 2.7 million euros. In comparison, Van der Bellen's run-off opponent Norbert Hofer was vested with 3.4 million euros by his party. The Greens however, suspected that this sum only encompassed monetary and no material donations.

By running as a non-partisan candidate, Van der Bellen could also avoid an official requirement for approval of the Green Party Congress, therefore discussions about the party basis as well as a possible non-unanimous voting result were bypassed. As an independent candidate, it would legally not have been necessary for him to disclose the campaign donations. Nevertheless, the Association "Together for Van der Bellen" still published them on their website.

=== Election ===
In the first round of the 2016 presidential election, Van der Bellen ranked second with 21.34% of the votes being behind Norbert Hofer with 35.05%.

In the second round of voting (the runoff election) on 22 May 2016, the provisional final result excluding postal votes was: Norbert Hofer with 51.93% and Alexander Van der Bellen with 48.07%. Therefore, no winner could be determined on election night. On the following day (23 May 2016), Interior Minister Wolfgang Sobotka announced the final results including postal votes, according to which Van der Bellen received 50.35% and Hofer 49.64% of valid votes. Van der Bellen had a lead of 31,026 votes on Hofer. The voter turnout was 72.7%.

The complete final result was announced with a correction (in a constituency votes were counted twice), after which the difference has been reduced to less than 31,000 valid votes between Van der Bellen and Hofer, but this had little effect on the total percentage. (The changes only affected the third decimal place.)

Following the election, the designated President Van der Bellen reaffirmed his views on the Freedom Party and stated that he would not charge them with the task to form a government, even if they became the largest party. This would have been a novelty in the history of the Second Republic, since so far all Presidents had charged the chairperson of the largest party with the government formation.

On 8 June, Freedom Party chairman Heinz-Christian Strache brought in a 150-page notice of appeal to the Constitutional Court, which was intended to highlight deficiencies in the conduct of the second voting round. On 1 July 2016, the Constitutional Court consented the electoral appeal of the Freedom Party. Because of irregularities that occurred in the counting of postal votes, the election had to be repeated in the whole of Austria.

Van der Bellen also won the second runoff election postponed to 4 December 2016, receiving 53.8% of valid votes (with a voter turnout of 74.2%). While Van der Bellen's lead in the run-off vote in May 2016 amounted to barely less than 31,000 votes, he was able to expand his lead in the second run-off vote in December 2016 to over 348,000 valid votes.

On 22 May 2022, Van der Bellen announced his plans to run for a second term. He later won re-election in the 2022 presidential election on 9 October 2022 with 56.2% of the votes.

=== Inauguration ===
Alexander Van der Bellen was inaugurated as President of Austria on 26 January 2017. After his inaugural speech he met with the Kern government and was greeted with a military ceremony as the new commander-in-chief of the Bundesheer.

== Honours and awards ==
Austrian honours

- Grand Decoration of Honour in Gold with Star of the Decoration of Honour for Services to the Republic of Austria (4 May 2004).
- Grand Star of the Decoration of Honour for Services to the Republic of Austria (26 January 2017).

Foreign honours

- Grand Cordon of the Order of Leopold (21 March 2022)
- Collar of the Order of the Cross of Terra Mariana (21 May 2021)
- Grand Cross Special Class of the Order of Merit of the Federal Republic of Germany (21 October 2025)
- Knight Grand Cross with Collar of the Order of Merit of the Italian Republic (27 June 2019)
- Grand Star of the Order of Merit of the Principality of Liechtenstein (20 March 2018)
- Knight Grand Cross of the Order of the Netherlands Lion (27 June 2022)
- Grand Collar of the Military Order of Saint James of the Sword (18 June 2019)
- Member 1st class of the Order of the White Double Cross (21 March 2019)
- Member of the Order for Exceptional Merits (8 December 2022)
- Recipient of the Grand Order of Mugunghwa (14 June 2021)
- Collar of the Order pro Merito Melitensi (16 November 2017)
- Collar of the Order of the White Lion (2 March 2023)

Other awards

- Statue der Erinnerung of the International Auschwitz Committee (2018)

Party political offices
| Preceded by Christoph Chorherr | Spokesman of the Green Party; 1997–2008 | Succeeded by Eva Glawischnig |
Political offices
| Preceded by Heinz Fischer | President of Austria; 2017–present | Incumbent |
