= Johannes Voggenhuber =

Austrian politician

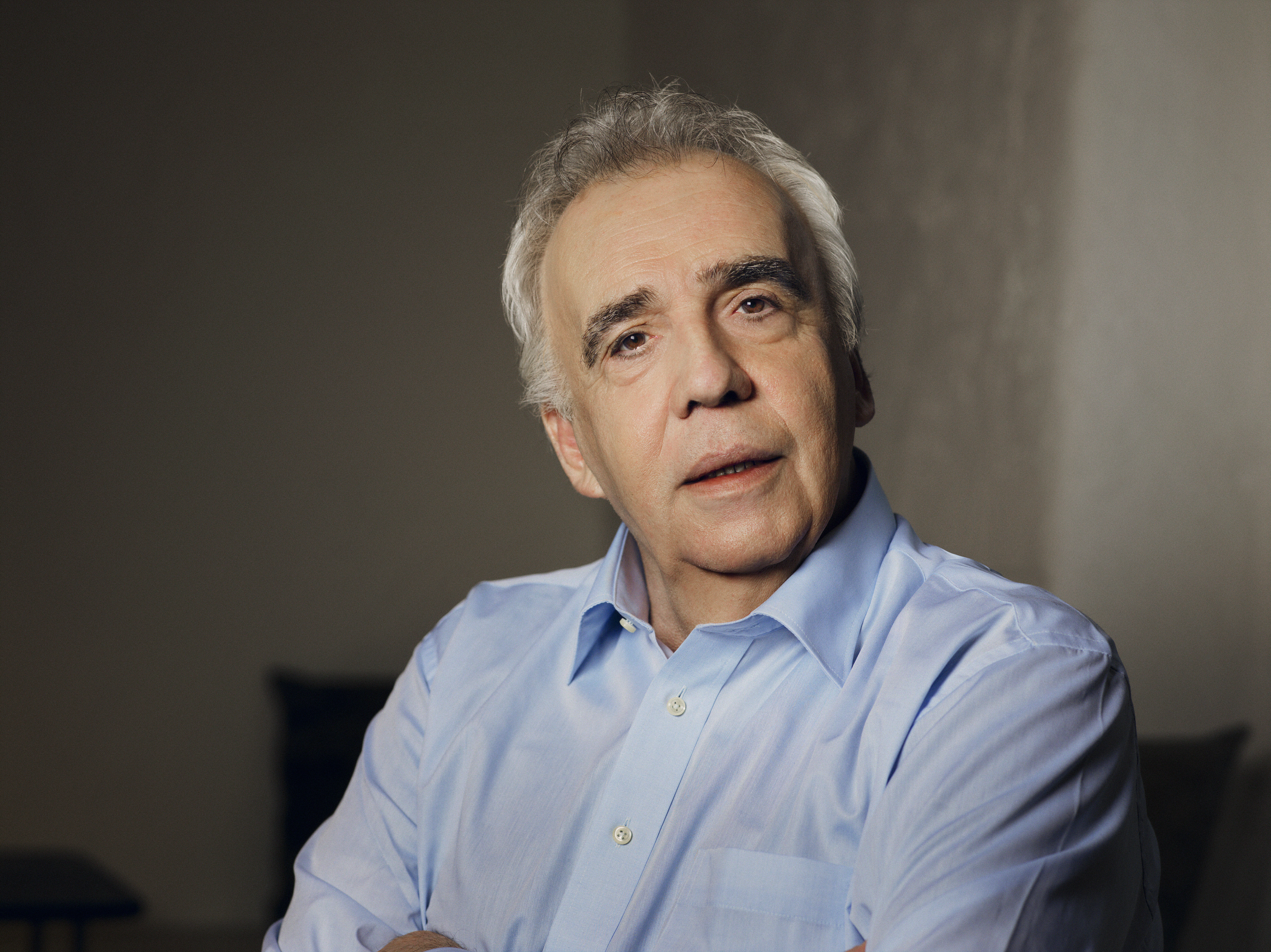

Spokesman of the Green Party
- Preceded by: Freda Meissner-Blau
- Succeeded by: Peter Pilz
- In office 6 December 1988 – 1992

Personal details
- Born: 5 June 1950 (age 75) Salzburg, Salzburg, Austria
- Party: The Greens

Johannes Voggenhuber (born 5 June 1950) is an Austrian politician and former Member of the European Parliament (MEP) for the Austrian Green Party, which is part of the European Greens. He was vice president of the Parliament's Constitutional Affairs Committee.

From 1982 to 1987, he was member of the city council in Salzburg. From 1988 to 1992, he was federal spokesman for the Austrian Greens, and between 1990 and 1996, Member of the National Council of Austria (Nationalrat). From 1995 to 2009 he was Member of the European Parliament.

He is married and has two children.
