= Eva Glawischnig-Piesczek =

Austrian politician (born 1969)

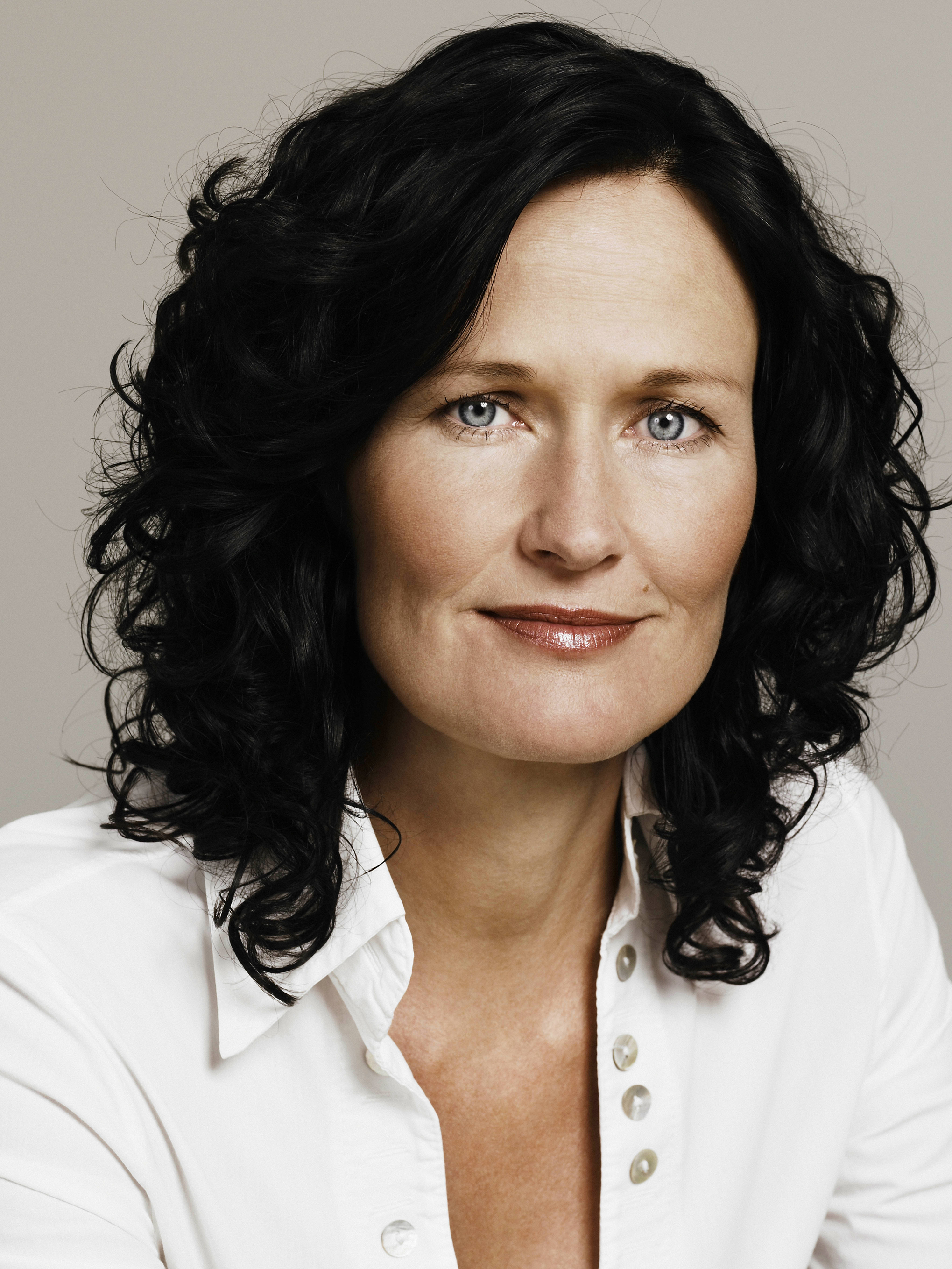
- Glawischnig in 2006

Spokeswoman of the Green Party
- In office 3 October 2008 – 18 May 2017
- Preceded by: Alexander van der Bellen
- Succeeded by: Ingrid Felipe

Personal details
- Born: 28 February 1969 (age 57) Villach, Carinthia, Austria
- Party: Green Party (1992−2018)
- Spouse: Volker Piesczek (m. 2005)
- Education: University of Graz
- Website: sustainability-consulting.at

Eva Glawischnig-Piesczek (née Glawischnig; born 28 February 1969) is an Austrian politician of the Austrian Green Party, and its federal spokeswoman from 2008 until 2017. She was the plaintiff in the landmark case Eva Glawishnig-Piesczek v. Facebook Ireland, in which she sued Facebook for defamation to compel the social media company to globally censor the "defamatory and all equivalent" posts.

== Background ==
Born in Villach, Carinthia, Glawischnig attended gymnasium in Spittal an der Drau and took her Matura exams there. She then studied law at the University of Graz, Styria, graduating in 1993 (Magistra) and 1999 (doctorate) respectively.

Glawischnig worked as a legal adviser for Global 2000 from 1992 until 1996. In that year she embarked on a career in regional politics for the Green Party of Vienna, later moving on to the federal level. She has been a member of the National Council of Austria (Nationalrat) since 1999 and became vice-chairperson of the Austrian Green Party in 2002. Glawischnig has been a persistent critic of the Austrian government headed by Wolfgang Schüssel. On 30 October 2006 she became Third Speaker of the Austrian Parliament, as the first representative of the Greens in this office.

On 3 October 2008, Glawischnig became the Greens' federal spokeswoman following Alexander Van der Bellen's resignation.

On 18 May 2017, she resigned as the Greens' federal spokeswoman and retired from politics, citing personal reasons.

She has been working for an international gambling company Novomatic since 2018.

=== Lawsuit against Facebook ===
In 2016, Glawischnig requested Facebook to remove a post criticizing her in sharp terms. After Facebook failed to remove the post, she brought a claim in Vienna court, Eva Glawischnig-Pieszcek v. Facebook Ireland. The case became an important legal question of whether a court in the European Union could compel a social media company to globally censor a user's posting, even for viewers outside of the EU's jurisdiction. On 3 October 2019 the Court of Justice for the European Union decided that an Austrian court could indeed order the global removal of the offensive posts, and all future posts similar to them that are designed to defame Glawishnig. Supporters of the Court's landmark ruling believe it empowers online users to defend themselves against defamation or other online abuse, while critics have called out the possibility of mass censorship due to the challenging nature of online rule enforcement.
