= The Greens (Austria) =

Austrian political party

The Greens – The Green Alternative Die Grünen – Die Grüne Alternative
- Abbreviation: GRÜNE
- Spokeswoman: Leonore Gewessler
- Managing director: Angela Stoytchev
- Leader in the EP: Lena Schilling
- Founded: 1993 (Die Grünen); 1986 (Merger of Vereinte Grüne Österreichs and Alternative Liste Österreich)
- Headquarters: Lindengasse 40; A-1070 Vienna
- Youth wing: Young Greens (2010–2017)
- Ideology: Green politics; Eco-feminism; Progressivism
- Political position: Centre-left to left-wing
- European affiliation: European Green Party
- European Parliament group: Greens–European Free Alliance
- International affiliation: Global Greens
- Colours: Green
- National Council: 16 / 183
- Federal Council: 5 / 60
- Governorships: 0 / 9
- Landtag Seats: 42 / 440
- European Parliament: 2 / 20

Party flag

Website
- gruene.at

The Greens – The Green Alternative (German: Die Grünen – Die Grüne Alternative, pronounced [diː ˈɡʁyːnən diː ˈɡʁyːnə ˌaltɛʁnaˈtiːvə]) is a green political party in Austria. The Greens currently sit in opposition. Formerly, they were part of the Schallenberg government, the Second Kurz government, and the Nehammer government. It won 8.2% of votes cast in the 2024 Austrian legislative election. The current President of Austria, Alexander Van der Bellen, is from the Green Party.

The party was founded in 1986 under the name "Green Alternative" (Grüne Alternative), following the merger of the more moderate Green party Vereinte Grüne Österreichs (United Greens of Austria VGÖ, founded 1982), which had its roots in the anti-nuclear power movement and the more progressive party Alternative Liste Österreichs (Alternative List Austria, ALÖ, founded 1982) formed by ecology, feminist, peace, Third World and student activists. Since 1993, the party has carried the official name Die Grünen – Die Grüne Alternative (Grüne), but refers to itself in English as "Austrian Greens". There are still differences between the former members of the old Alternative and VGÖ factions within the party, reflected in the differing approaches of the national and state parties.

Apart from ecological issues such as environmental protection, the Greens are pro-European, and campaign for the rights of minorities and advocate a socio-ecological (ökosozial) tax reform. Their basic values according to their charter in 2001 are: "direct democracy, nonviolence, ecology, solidarity, feminism and self-determination". The party is a member of the European Green Party and Global Greens.

== History ==
In 1978 the Austrian Green movement began with the successful campaign to prevent the opening of the Zwentendorf Nuclear Power Plant (which had been favoured by Bruno Kreisky's government). Another major event in the Austrian environmental movement were the sit-in protests in 1984 which prevented the Danube power plant at Hainburg from being built.

The VGÖ and ALÖ contested the 1983 Austrian legislative election, scoring 1.9 and 1.4 percent of the vote each but failing to win any seats. Following this the two parties agreed joint lists for state elections in Salzburg, Tyrol, Voralberg and Styria, although other environmentalist lists also contested elections during this time. The joint lists enjoyed success in Voralberg, achieving 13 percent and four seats in 1984, and Styria, where they won 3.7 percent of the vote and two seats. The immediate catalyst for the merger of the two parties was the candidacy of activist Freda Meissner-Blau in the 1986 Austrian presidential election, in which she won 5.5 percent of the vote. A few months after the election members of the VGÖ and ALÖ, along with journalist, environmentalist and former Socialist Party member Günther Nenning's Citizens' Parliamentary Initiative and other groups to form Green Alternative.

In its early years the party described itself as an alliance of moderate ecologists, former members of the Socialist Party's left unhappy with the leadership of the moderate Franz Vranitzky, peace activists, Eurocommunists, anti-nuclear activists and Christian leftists.

=== Federal level ===
In the 1986 parliamentary elections the Green Party started off with 4.82% of all votes cast and entered parliament with eight National Council mandates. In the early elections to National Council in 2002, the Green Party nationwide received 9.47% of votes, and won 17 mandates to the National Council. At that time, it was the highest number of votes garnered by any European Green party.

When the Greens took their seats in parliament for the first time, they chose to appear somewhat unconventional. They initially refused to adapt their behaviour to that of the other parties; an example of this is their refusal to elect a chairperson (Klubobmann/Klubobfrau) and designated a puppet made out of straw instead. Delegates would appear in parliament dressed in casual wear such as jeans and trainers. Worldwide attention was drawn when the Green delegate Andreas Wabl hoisted a swastika flag on the speakers podium in the Austrian parliament, protesting against then Federal President Kurt Waldheim. They were also highly active in parliament, proposing 60 pieces of legislation and asking over 400 written questions within 18 months of the Greens' entry to the National Council, more than any other party.

After the national election in 2002, the Greens entered into preliminary negotiations about a possible coalition government with the conservative ÖVP. During negotiations, party leadership was accused of internally black-mailing skeptical members. Negotiations between the two parties were subsequently called off, after the results with the ÖVP were not sufficient. The Green youth organisation Grünalternative Jugend (Green Alternative Youth or GAJ) briefly occupied the rooms of the Green parliamentary club in the Austrian parliament building in protest.

In 2003 three Green federal counsellors formed their own club in the Upper House Federal Council (Bundesrat) of Parliament.

After the 2006 elections the Greens gained four seats and ended up with 21 seats and became the third largest party in Parliament, however did not have enough mandates to form a coalition government with either the Austrian People's Party (ÖVP) or Social Democratic Party (SPÖ) and became the largest opposition party, while the SPÖ and ÖVP formed a grand coalition government.

The party suffered from internal struggles in 2017, losing its Youth wing (which split away and formed an ephemeral joint list with the Communist Party of Austria) and later experiencing a split of Peter Pilz's faction, forming the Peter Pilz List.

The 2017 legislative election saw a collapse for the party, scoring only 3.8% and losing its representation in the Nationalrat for the first time since 1986. Following the results, party spokesman Ingrid Felipe resigned from her post and was replaced by Werner Kogler.

The party saw a revival in the 2019 European election, in which they scored 14.1% and elected 2 MEPs. The election saw the collapse of JETZ.

The party eventually later this year, experienced a strong recovery and performed better well leading up to the 2019 snap legislative election, the Greens returned to the National Council (German: Nationalrat) with their best ever result in a legislative election, scoring 13.9% and electing 26 MPs, an upswing of 10.2% from 2017.

In the 2024 Austrian legislative election, the party lost 10 seats and fell to 8.2%. The party was not included in the initial coalition negotiations between the ÖVP, SPÖ and NEOS.

=== Chairpersons since 1986 ===
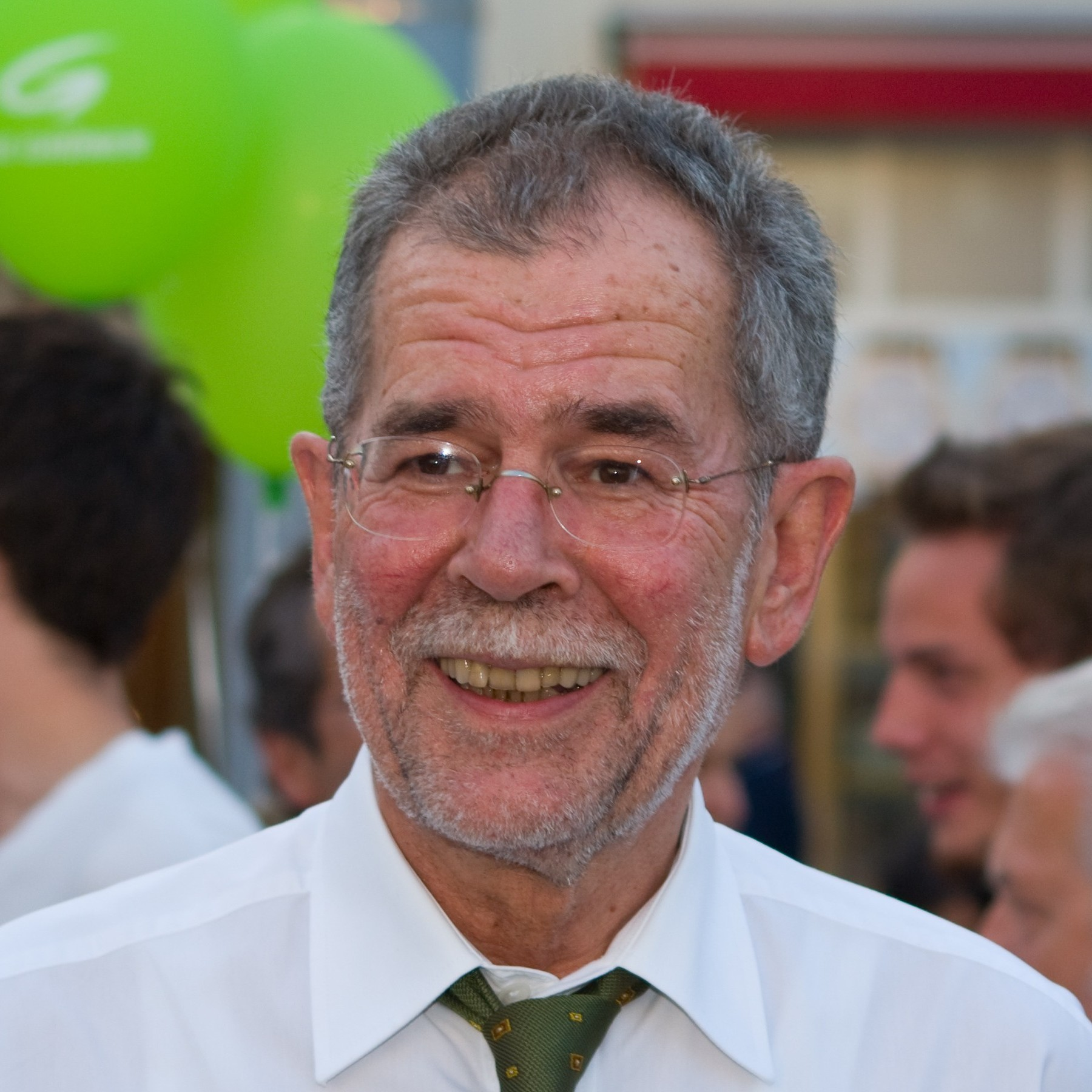
Alexander Van der Bellen, federal spokesperson of the Green Party between 1997 and 2008. He was elected President of Austria in 2016.

The chart below shows a timeline of the Green chairpersons and the Chancellors of Austria. The left green bar shows all the chairpersons (Bundessprecher, abbreviated as "Chair.") of the Green party, and the right bar shows the corresponding make-up of the Austrian government at that time. The red (SPÖ), black (ÖVP), and light grey (Independent) colours correspond to which party led the federal government (Bundesregierung, abbreviated as "Govern."). The last names of the respective chancellors are shown, the Roman numeral stands for the cabinets.

=== Federal state level ===
The Green party also entered the parliaments or assemblies (Landtag) of Austrian federal states and communal governments. Following is an analysis of the party on the federal state (Länder) level:

==== Burgenland ====
Green Alternative first stood in state elections in Burgenland in 1987, taking 2.2 percent of the vote but no seat. The Greens first entered the Burgenland state parliament in 2000, receiving 5.49% of the vote and winning two seats.

In the 2025 Burgenland state election, the party won 5.66% of the vote and held on to their two seats. After swift negotiations, the Greens entered a governing coalition with the Social Democrats, making Burgenland the only Austrian federal state to be governed by the Greens.

==== Carinthia ====
In the southernmost federal state Carinthia, different Green parties ran state elections: the KEL/AL in 1984, Anderes Kärnten in 1989 and 1994, and Demokratie 99 in 1999. These parties were, however, never able to enter the federal state assembly.

In the 2023 Carinthian state election, the Greens narrowly missed the 4% threshold for representation in the state assembly (Landtag), receiving 3.85% of the vote. On a local level, the Greens hold seats in the municipal councils (Gemeinderäte) of Klagenfurt and Villach, alongside those of various smaller municipalities.

==== Lower Austria ====
In 1998 the Lower Austrian Greens were represented with two delegates in the federal state assembly. In the federal state elections in 2003 the Greens received 7.22% and thus won four mandates, which enabled them to form a parliamentary group - called club in Austrian politics - in the assembly. With Madeleine Petrovic, the Lower Austrian Greens have a former federal spokeswoman and one of the most outspoken animal activists of Austria as their leader (Klubobfrau). In 2005 the Lower Austrian Greens managed to win and take their seats in 100 municipal assemblies and as of 2005 had four vice-mayors. Their managing director in Lower Austria is Thomas Huber.

==== Salzburg ====
After the federal state elections in 1989 the Salzburg State Greens had two mandates in the Salzburg federal state assembly, in 1994 three and in 1999 again two. Under the leadership of Cyriak Schwaighofer the Greens performed under their expectations in the 2004 federal state elections and could not achieve the desired club status of at least three mandates. As voter-current analyses showed, the small increases in votes were largely due to former voters of the Liberal Forum (LiF), which did not run in the Salzburg elections. In March 2009 they were down from 8% to 7.3%, keeping their two seats in Salzburg State's parliament.

The Bürgerliste (Citizen List) is the common platform of the Greens in Salzburg municipality. The List entered the city council in the 1987 election, taking 10.1 percent of the vote and four seats. Like many other autonomous municipal groups it carries its own name.

==== Styria ====
The Styrian Greens have three delegates sitting in the federal state assembly, federal state spokesperson Lambert Schönleitner, Sandra Krautwaschl, and Lara Köck. There are two independent Greens parties: on the one hand the federal state party, on the other hand there is the Die Grünen - Alternative Liste Graz party for the federal state capital Graz. In the Graz city-council the Greens are represented by Sigi Binder, Lisa Rücker, Hermann Candussi and Christina Jahn.

Styria has the largest Austrian Green youth organization in Austria, called Grüne Jugend Steiermark (Green Youth Styria). Beside the Green Youth Styria there also exists Austria's first Green students' organization, the ECO Students.

==== Tyrol ====
In Tyrol the Greens (official name: Die Grünen – die Grüne Alternative Tirol) were able to win seats and placed in 1994 Eva Lichtenberger as Austria's first Green state councillor in a local government, responsible for environmental affairs.

The 2003 Tyrolean Landtag (state assembly) elections were the best ever for the Austrian Greens, winning 15.59% of all votes cast. In the capital city of Innsbruck the Greens reached approximately 27% of the vote. The Tyrolean election result also meant that the Greens could for the first time in history nominate a member to the Upper House of Parliament. Since 2003 the Green delegate to the Federal Council (Bundesrat) of Parliament is Eva Konrad, former chairlady of the Austrian National Union of Students (Österreichische HochschülerInnenschaft) of the University of Innsbruck.

The communal elections of 2004 brought a doubling of the mandates for the Tyrolean Greens. City elections in Innsbruck in 2006 were a success for the Greens and they gained 8 of the 40 seats in the parliament of Innsbruck.

In the elections to the European parliament the Tyrolean Greens obtained 17.32%, their best result until then. Eva Lichtenberger subsequently changed her position to become a Member of the European Parliament (MEP). The results in Innsbruck were particularly good: there the Green party received 28.28%, which made it the strongest party, even before the Christian-democratic ÖVP and the social-democratic SPÖ. The Greens were able to score on a number of issues that they have been fighting for years. Besides the social topics above all the problems of transit traffic over the Alps was important.

The Tyrolean Greens have experts on traffic issues with MEP Eva Lichtenberger, the national speaker and club chairperson Georg Willi and the speaker of group of regional of Innsbruck Gerhard Fritz. The issue of transit traffic through the Tyrol is of great importance, because the state is troubled by the massive transit traffic between Germany and Italy over the Brenner Pass. Since the Tyrol sits right in between Germany and Italy, the bulk of the commercial traffic passes through there. This heavy-duty traffic has devastating effects on the fragile alpine environment and decreases the quality of life for the inhabitants. Since the entry to the European Union, Austria had to give up any quota limitations on how much international traffic coming from EU-countries is allowed to pass through its territory.

The Tyrolean Greens accused the federal government of not having pushed for a better deal with the European Union concerning transit-traffic and in effect abandoning the concerns of the citizens. They also heavily criticised the government's failure to negotiate a follow-up of the 1994 transit-treaty signed with the EU. Apart from the Greens, various anti-transit civic movements have formed to protest against the environmental damages caused by the traffic.

Sitting in the National Council is Kurt Grünewald, a Tyrolean member of parliament, as well as the former leader of the Greens Alexander Van der Bellen, who has Tyrolean roots (he spent a part of his youth there and went to high school in Innsbruck).

The results of the Tyrolean Landtag elections:

Results of the Greens in Tyrolean State Assembly elections
Year	Percentage of votes received	Mandates out of total of 36 seats
2003	15.59% (+7.57)	5 (+2)
1999	8.02% (–2.66)	3 (–1)
1994	10.68% (+2.42)	4 (+1)
1989	8.26% (+5.34)	3 (+3)
1984	2.92%	0

2003 delegates: Sepp Brugger, Maria Scheiber, Uschi Schwarzl, Elisabeth Wiesmüller und Georg Willi (club chairman);
1999 delegates: Maria Scheiber, Elisabeth Wiesmüller, Georg Willi (club chairman);
1994 delegates: Bernhard Ernst, Franz Klug, Max Schneider und Georg Willi (club chairman [Klubobmann]);
1989 delegates: Eva Lichtenberger, Jutta Seethaler, Franz Klug.

==== Upper Austria ====
In 1997 the Upper Austrian Greens successfully entered the Upper Austrian Landtag (state assembly) for the first time. After the state elections in 2003 (state elections in Upper Austria are held every six years, not five like in the other states), the Greens were able to win even more seats. The campaign was already aimed at gaining ministerial seats in the state government. Since the conservative Christian-democratic ÖVP was the strongest party, this would have meant for the Greens to enter into a coalition government with them (the so-called "Schwarz-Grün" [Black-Green] coalition, named after the party-colours). This new political constellation was quite controversial amongst party members on both sides. In the Green party, the leader Rudi Anschober was able to convince party members and after some dealing became state councillor for environmental affairs. The Greens of the state capital of Linz under the leadership of city councillor Jürgen Himmelbauer were most against this black-green project.

On the national level, the Upper Austrian Greens were able to nominate and send to the parliamentary Upper House Federal Council (Bundesrat) councillor Ruperta Lichtenecker.

==== Vorarlberg ====
The Vorarlberg Greens were the first to ever win mandates in an Austrian state assembly election. Already in 1984 they were able to win 13% of the votes in the Vorarlberg state assembly elections, which for that time was an absolute sensation. The charismatic alpine farmer Kaspanaze Simma from Bregenzerwald was the leading candidate, it was mainly due to his efforts why the party was so instantly successful. Because of their strength, the Greens were allowed to form their own parliamentary fraction (Klub), which caused some logistical problems as the newly constructed Landtag building in 1981 only provided space for the traditional three parties (ÖVP, SPÖ, FPÖ), not four. Since the traditional organic farming sector is important in the western Austrian regions, the Greens were able to gain support.

In the following years the Greens were able to consolidate their position by gaining seats on the communal and municipal level. Occasionally they lost their official club status in the state assembly, when they fared poorly from 1999 to 2004. In 2006 the speaker of the Vorarlberg Greens was Johannes Rauch.

The results of the Vorarlberg Landtag elections:

Results of the Greens in the Vorarlberg State Assembly elections
Year	Percentage of votes received	Mandates out of total of 36 seats
2004	10,2% (+4.17)	4 (+2)
1999	6,03% (–1.73)	2 (–1)
1994	7,76% (+2.58)	3 (+1)
1989	5,18% (–7.82)	2 (–2)
1984^{1}	13,00%	4

^{1} Combined result of ALÖ and VGÖ

==== Vienna ====
The Viennese Greens started nominating candidates in the Vienna Gemeinderat (municipal council or state assembly) in 1983. In 1987 they scored 4.4 percent of the vote in Vienna's state elections, failing to win any seats, but they did take 55 out of 1,082 in the city's district council elections. They were able to enter the state assembly in 1991. Over the years they have been able to continually gather support. A lot of support has been coming from former Liberal Forum voters, after the liberals failed to enter any legislature. The traditional strongholds in Vienna for the Greens are the districts of Neubau (2005: 43.26%), Josefstadt (32.26%), Alsergrund (29.43%), Mariahilf (28.97%) and Wieden (25.14%).

In the 2001 Gemeinderat elections, the Greens were able to win the majority of a district for the first time. In the district of Neubau they won 32.55% and were able to nominate the Bezirksvorsteher (mayor of the district). The results of 2001 also allowed the Viennese Greens to nominate Stefan Schennach as federal councilor to the Upper House of Parliament (Bundesrat). But despite the strong gains, the Greens were not able to enter into a coalition government with the SPÖ, since the social-democrats were able to win an absolute majority.

The 2004 European Parliament election were the best for the Viennese Greens so far. From the total tally, they received 22%, which put them ahead of the Christian-democratic ÖVP and placed them on second position behind the SPÖ (37.7%). In Neubau the Greens received 41%. They were also able to win first place in the districts of Wieden, Mariahilf, Josefstadt and Alsergrund.

In the 2005 Gemeinderat elections, the Greens were able to win votes, but missed their target of becoming the second most powerful party and ended up on fourth place, right behind the right-wing Freedom Party (FPÖ). Because of the different weighing by districts, the Greens received 14 mandates, one more than the FPÖ. They were also able to place another city-councillor. In the districts, the party was able to consolidate their holding on Neubau, as well as win the majority of votes in Josefstadt. With that, the Greens were able to nominate a second Green district-mayor. The second place was won in the districts of Leopoldstadt, Margareten, Mariahilf, Rudolfsheim-Fünfhaus and Alsergrund.

The Green delegates to the Viennese Gemeinderat or Landtag as of 2006 were: Maria Vassilakou (club-chairlady [Klubobfrau]), Waltraut Antonov, Heidi Cammerlander, Christoph Chorherr, Sabine Gretner, Susanne Jerusalem, Alev Korun, Rüdiger Maresch, Martin Margulies, Sigrid Pilz, Ingrid Puller, Marie Ringler, Marco Schreuder, Claudia Sommer-Smolik. The two city-councillors are David Ellensohn and Monika Vana.

The 2010 results meant that the SPÖ was unable to hold the majority of seats in the Vienna city council and therefore had to rule together with the Greens performing for the first time as coalition partner. The current vice-governor/vice-mayor of Vienna as of 26 June 2019 is Birgit Hebein.

The results of the Viennese Gemeinderat elections:

Results of the Greens in the Viennese State Assembly elections
Year	Percentage of votes received	Mandates out of total of 100 seats	Further information
2010	12.64% (–1.99)	11 (–3)	1 Federal Councillor, 1 City Councillor
2005	14.63% (+2.18)	14 (+3)	1 Federal Councillor, 2 City Councillors
2001	12.45% (+4.51)	11 (+4)	1 Federal Councillor, 1 City Councillor
1996	7.94% (–1.14)	7 (±0)	1 City Councillor
1991	9.08% (+4.68)	7 (+7)	1 City Councillor
1987	4.4% (+1.9)	0	
1983^{1}	2.5% (+2.5)	0	

^{1} ran as Alternative Liste Wien (ALW)

== Organisation ==
In 2004 the Greens had about 3,000 members nationwide, although at present there are no uniform regulations for membership. Apart from the members, the Greens rely on a large number of volunteers. The party used to function on the principles of grassroots democracy (Basisdemokratie) and rotation principle (Rotationsprinzip), but this was stopped in the course of the time. The last basic-democratic element is the Urabstimmung, which is a vote on any issue that can be initiated with the petition of at least 100 members. As of 2003 however, no such vote has taken place.

The highest body is the Federal Congress (Bundeskongress), which convenes at least once a year. All federal state organisations send delegates, also the immigrants-organisation is allowed to send delegates as "the tenth Austrian state". The Federal Congress decides the electoral lists for the National Council elections and elections to the European parliament. The congress also elects the federal spokesperson (BundesprecherIn). The congress also decides the party program and sets the party guidelines.

In the last few years, the federal executive (Bundesvorstand) has developed into the actual decision-making centre. It meets at least once a week, mostly on Tuesdays, and determines the guidelines of daily politics. The federal executive also decides on party finances. The extended federal executive (Erweiterter Bundesvorstand) consists of a smaller number of delegates from each state and meets at least once a month. It takes care of the implementation of the party-guidelines, which were set by the party congress. It also chooses the representatives of the party spokesperson.

The highest office in the party is that of the federal spokesperson (Bundessprecher). The party's federal spokesman is Werner Kogler.

The federal state organisations (Landesorganisationen) are organised similarly: There are federal state meetings, which sometimes convene as a members meeting or a delegates meeting. Similar to the federal executive, there are federal state executives (Landesvorstände). The party charter also allows for each federal state group to hold a vote on basic issues as well that affect the whole party.

Independently in the National Council there also exists a Green National Council Club (faction), which can independently specify its guidelines. In recent years however an increasing fusion of the work between party and its club was noticeable. Michaela Sburny, successor of Franz Raft since June 2004 as the Greens' federal chairperson, was allowed to keep her National Council mandate. This means she is allowed to hold two offices at the same time, something that was frowned upon by the Greens previously.

There are different Green or Greenish organisations within the party and associated with it. These include:

- The Grünen Andersrum is the gay-, lesbian and transgender organisation, which is organised differently from state to state, and exists in all states except Vorarlberg and Burgenland. In Vienna, the Grünen Andersrum are a part of the party itself.
- The Grünen SeniorInnen (DGS) is the organisation for senior citizens. It was founded on March 9, 2001, in Vienna. The DGS fights for a policy more friendly to senior citizens and their right to lead an active, fulfilling and self-determined life.
- The Initiative Grüne MigrantInnen (IGM) is the Green group for immigrants in Austria. Their demands are a facilitation of integration into life in Austria, equal rights and equal opportunities, fight against racism and other issues concerning migrants.
- The Grüne und Alternative Studierende (GRAS) is a separate party which candidates in the elections for the Austrian National Union of Students (Österreichische HochschülerInnenschaft – ÖH). There they are the biggest faction, together with the Socialist Students of Austria (Verband Sozialistischer StudentInnen Österreichs – VSStÖ) they form the executive committee of the Austrian National Union for Students.
- The Grünalternative Jugend (GAJ) is the youth organisation of the Green party. The GAJ existed since the 1990s. It is a member of the Federation of Young European Greens (FYEG). The GAJ sees itself rather as extreme left. The organisation is subdivided into smaller groups for each state.
- The Grüne Frauenorganisation is the organisation for women. As of 2005, it does not exist yet in every state.
- ECO Students is a Green student's organisation, which currently only exists in Styria.
- The Grüne Wirtschaft is the Green economic organisation and runs in the elections for the Economic Parliament of the Austrian Federal Economic Chamber (Wirtschaftskammer Österreich – WKÖ).
- The Alternative und Unabhängige GewerkschafterInnen (AUGE/UG) is the Green labour union. It runs in the elections for the labour parliament of the Austrian Labour Chamber (Arbeiterkammer – AK).

The education and training of new Green politicians is done by the Grüne Bildungswerkstatt, which is an independent voluntary association. The Grüne Bildungswerkstatt is financed by the republic, as regulated by Austrian law for the equal treatment of all parliamentary parties.

== Electoral results ==
=== National Council ===
Election	Leader	Votes	%	Seats	+/–	Government
1986	Freda Meissner-Blau	234,028	4.82 (#4)	8 / 183	New	Opposition
1990	Johannes Voggenhuber	225,084	4.78 (#4)	10 / 183	▲2	Opposition
1994	Madeleine Petrovic	338,538	7.31 (#4)	13 / 183	▲3	Opposition
1995	Madeleine Petrovic	233,208	4.81 (#5)	9 / 183	▼4	Opposition
1999	Alexander Van der Bellen	342,260	7.40 (#4)	14 / 183	▲5	Opposition
2002	Alexander Van der Bellen	464,980	9.47 (#4)	17 / 183	▲3	Opposition
2006	Alexander Van der Bellen	520,130	11.05 (#3)	21 / 183	▲4	Opposition
2008	Alexander Van der Bellen	509,936	10.43 (#5)	20 / 183	▼1	Opposition
2013	Eva Glawischnig	582,657	12.42 (#4)	24 / 183	▲4	Opposition
2017	Ulrike Lunacek	192,638	3.80 (#6)	0 / 183	▼24	No seats
2019	Werner Kogler	664,055	13.90 (#4)	26 / 183	▲26	ÖVP–GRÜNE majority
2024	Werner Kogler	402,107	8.2 (#5)	15 / 183	▼11	Opposition

=== President ===
In the 2016 Austrian presidential election, Alexander Van der Bellen won the election with 50.35% of the votes and defeated Norbert Hofer the Freedom Party of Austria politician who received 49.65% of the vote. Van der Bellen became the first president from the Greens. On 1 July, the Constitutional Court overturned the result of the election and ordered a re-run because of irregularities during the counting process. On 4 December 2016 Van der Bellen won the re-run of the second round with 53.79% of the votes to Hofer's 46.21%.

Election	Candidate	First round result			Second round result		
Election	Candidate	Votes	%	Result	Votes	%	Result
1986	Freda Meissner-Blau	259,689	5.5	3rd place	—N/a		
1992	Robert Jungk	266,954	5.7	4th place	—N/a		
1998	Gertraud Knoll	566,551	13.6	2nd place	—N/a		
2004	did not contest						
2010	did not contest						
2016	Alexander Van der Bellen	913,218	21.3	Runner-up	2,472,892	53.8	Won
2022	Alexander Van der Bellen	2,299,592	56.7	Won	—N/a		

=== European Parliament ===
Election	List leader	Votes	%	Seats	+/–	EP Group
1996	Johannes Voggenhuber	258,250	6.81 (#4)	1 / 21	New	G
1999	Johannes Voggenhuber	260,273	9.29 (#4)	2 / 21	▲1	Greens/EFA
2004	Johannes Voggenhuber	322,429	12.89 (#4)	2 / 18	0	Greens/EFA
2009	Ulrike Lunacek	284,505	9.93 (#5)	2 / 17	0	Greens/EFA
2014	Ulrike Lunacek	410,089	14.52 (#4)	3 / 18	▲1	Greens/EFA
2019	Werner Kogler	532,194	14.08 (#4)	3 / 19	0	Greens/EFA
2024	Lena Schilling	364,251	10.74 (#4)	2 / 20	▼1	Greens/EFA

=== State Parliaments ===
State	Year	Votes	%	Seats	±	Government
Burgenland	2025	11,062	5.7 (#4)	2 / 36	0	SPÖ-GRÜNE
Carinthia	2023	11,676	3.9 (#5)	0 / 36	0	No seats
Lower Austria	2023	68,276	7.6 (#4)	4 / 56	▲1	Opposition
Salzburg	2023	22,074	8.2 (#5)	3 / 36	0	Opposition
Styria	2024	40,870	6.2 (#4)	3 / 48	▼3	Opposition
Tyrol	2022	31,598	9.2 (#5)	3 / 36	▼1	Opposition
Upper Austria	2021	99,496	12.3 (#4)	7 / 56	▲1	Opposition
Vienna	2025	92,130	14.19 (#3)	16 / 100	▼	Opposition
Vorarlberg	2024	22,926	12.4 (#3)	4 / 36	▼3	Opposition

=== Results timeline ===
Year	(Austria) Pres.	(Austria) NR	(European Union) EU	(Burgenland) Bgld	(Carinthia) Ktn	(Lower Austria) NÖ	(Salzburg (state)) Sbg	(Styria) Stmk	(Tyrol (federal state)) Tyrol	(Upper Austria) OÖ	(Vienna) Wien	(Vorarlberg) Vbg
1983	N/A	3.3 (Note: Greens and VGÖ ran separately.)	N/A			1.5 (Note: VGÖ and ALÖ ran separately.)					2.5 (Note: ALÖ.)	
1984	N/A	3.3	N/A		1.8	1.5	4.3		2.9		2.5	13.0
1985	N/A	3.3	N/A		1.8	1.5	4.3		2.9	3.9	2.5	13.0
1986	5.5 (R1)	▲4.8	N/A		1.8	1.5	4.3	3.7	2.9	3.9	2.5	13.0
1987	W	▲4.8	N/A	2.2	1.8	1.5	4.3	3.7	2.9	3.9	▲5.2	13.0
1988	W	▲4.8	N/A	2.2	1.8	▲3.6	4.3	3.7	2.9	3.9	▲5.2	13.0
1989	W	▲4.8	N/A	2.2	3.3	▲3.6	▲7.9	3.7	▲9.5	3.9	▲5.2	▼10.1
1990	W	▼4.8	N/A	2.2	3.3	▲3.6	▲7.9	3.7	▲9.5	3.9	▲5.2	▼10.1
1991	W	▼4.8	N/A	▲3.4	3.3	▲3.6	▲7.9	▼4.6	▲9.5	5.7	▲10.9	▼10.1
1992	▲5.8 (R1)	▼4.8	N/A	▲3.4	3.3	▲3.6	▲7.9	▼4.6	▲9.5	5.7	▲10.9	▼10.1
1993	W	▼4.8	N/A	▲3.4	3.3	▲4.4	▲7.9	▼4.6	▲9.5	5.7	▲10.9	▼10.1
1994	W	▲7.3	N/A	▲3.4	▼1.6	▲4.4	▲7.3	▼4.6	▲10.7	5.7	▲10.9	▲7.8
1995	W	▼4.8	N/A	▲3.4	▼1.6	▲4.4	▲7.3	▲4.3	Proporz	5.7	▲10.9	▲7.8
1996	W	▼4.8	6.8	▼2.5	▼1.6	▲4.4	▲7.3	▲4.3	Proporz	5.7	▼7.9	▲7.8
1997	W	▼4.8	6.8	▼2.5	▼1.6	▲4.4	▲7.3	▲4.3	Proporz	5.8	▼7.9	▲7.8
1998	▲13.6 (R1)	▼4.8	6.8	▼2.5	▼1.6	▲4.5	▲7.3	▲4.3	Proporz	5.8	▼7.9	▲7.8
1999		▲7.4	▲9.3	▼2.5	3.9 (Note: As part of the Democracy 99 alliance with the VGÖ, EL, and LiF.)	▲4.5	▼5.4	▲4.3	▼8.0	5.8	▼7.9	▼6.0
2000		▲7.4	▲9.3	▲5.5	3.9	▲4.5	▼5.4	▲5.6	▼8.0	5.8	▼7.9	▼6.0
2001		▲7.4	▲9.3	▲5.5	3.9	▲4.5	▼5.4	▲5.6	▼8.0	5.8	▲12.5	▼6.0
2002		▲9.5	▲9.3	▲5.5	3.9	▲4.5	▼5.4	▲5.6	▼8.0	5.8	▲12.5	▼6.0
2003		▲9.5	▲9.3	▲5.5	3.9	▲7.2	▼5.4	▲5.6	▲**15.6**	▲9.1	▲12.5	▼6.0
2004	Did not stand	▲9.5	▲12.9	▲5.5	▲6.7	▲7.2	▲8.0	▲5.6	▲**15.6**		▲12.5	▲10.2
2005	Did not stand	▲9.5	▲12.9	▼5.2	▲6.7	▲7.2	▲8.0	▼4.7	▲**15.6**		▲14.6	▲10.2
2006	Did not stand	▲11.1	▲12.9	▼5.2	▲6.7	▲7.2	▲8.0	▼4.7	▲**15.6**		▲14.6	▲10.2
2007	Did not stand	▲11.1	▲12.9	▼5.2	▲6.7	▲7.2	▲8.0	▼4.7	▲**15.6**		▲14.6	▲10.2
2008	Did not stand	▼10.4	▲12.9	▼5.2	▲6.7	▼6.9	▲8.0	▼4.7	▼10.7		▲14.6	▲10.2
2009	Did not stand	▼10.4	▼9.9	▼5.2	▼5.2	▼6.9	▼7.4	▼4.7	▼10.7	▲9.2	▲14.6	▲10.6
2010	Did not stand	▼10.4	▼9.9	▼4.2	▼5.2	▼6.9	▼7.4	▲5.6	▼10.7		▼12.6	▲10.6
2011	Did not stand	▼10.4	▼9.9	▼4.2	▼5.2	▼6.9	▼7.4	▲5.6	▼10.7			▲10.6
2012	Did not stand	▼10.4	▼9.9	▼4.2	▼5.2	▼6.9	▼7.4	▲5.6	▼10.7			▲10.6
2013	Did not stand	▲12.4	▼9.9	▼4.2	▲**12.1**	▲**8.1**	▲**20.2**	▲5.6	▲12.6			▲10.6
2014	Did not stand	▲12.4	▲**14.5**	▼4.2		▲**8.1**		▲5.6				▲17.1
2015	Did not stand	▲12.4	▲**14.5**	▲6.4		▲**8.1**		▲6.7		▲10.3	▼11.8	
2016	▲21.3 (R1) ▲ ~~50.4 (R2)~~ ▲**53.8 (R2)**	▲12.4	▲**14.5**	▲6.4		▲**8.1**		▲6.7		Proporz		
2017	W	▼3.8	▲**14.5**	▲6.4		▲**8.1**		▲6.7		Proporz		
2018	W	▼3.8	▲**14.5**	▲6.4	▼3.1	▼6.4	▼9.3	▲6.7	▼10.7	Proporz		
2019	W	▲**13.9**	▼14.1	▲6.4	▼3.1	▼6.4		▲**12.1**		Proporz		▲**18.9**
2020	W		▼14.1	▲**6.7**	▼3.1	▼6.4		▲**12.1**		Proporz	▲**14.8**	
2021	W		▼14.1	▲**6.7**	▼3.1	▼6.4		▲**12.1**		▲**12.3**	▲**14.8**	
2022	▲**56.7 (R1)**		▼14.1	▲**6.7**	▼3.1	▼6.4		▲**12.1**	▼9.2	Proporz	▲**14.8**	
2023			▼14.1	▲**6.7**	▲3.9	▲7.6	▼8.2	▲**12.1**	▼9.2	Proporz	▲**14.8**	
2024		▼8.2	▼10.7	▲**6.7**	▲3.9	▲7.6	▼8.2	▼6.2	▼9.2	Proporz	▲**14.8**	▼12.4
2025		▼8.2	▼10.7	▼5.7	▲3.9	▲7.6	▼8.2	▼6.2	▼9.2	Proporz	▼14.5	▼12.4
Year	(Austria) Pres.	(Austria) NR	(European Union) EU	(Burgenland) Bgld	(Carinthia) Ktn	(Lower Austria) NÖ	(Salzburg (state)) Sbg	(Styria) Stmk	(Tyrol (federal state)) Tyrol	(Upper Austria) OÖ	(Vienna) Wien	(Vorarlberg) Vbg
**Bold** indicates best result to date. Present in legislature (in opposition) / Present in presidential first round Junior coalition partner / Present in presidential second round Senior coalition partner / Presidential winner

== Prominent members ==
Among the most notable founding members and mentors are or were Professor Alexander Tollmann, the painter Friedensreich Hundertwasser, actor Herbert Fux, the mayor of Steyregg Josef Buchner (the first Green mayor in Austria – in 1987 excluded from the Green parliamentary club), Freda Meissner-Blau and Günther Nenning, with Nobel Prize laureate Konrad Lorenz supporting the 1984 protests at Hainburg.

Today, Green politicians include (in alphabetical order)

- Rudolf Anschober (State councillor of Upper Austria)
- Thomas Blimlinger (Mayor of the Viennese district Neubau)
- Dieter Brosz (former MP (former member of the lower house National Council), spokesman for education)
- Christoph Chorherr (Member of the state assembly of Vienna)
- Eva Glawischnig-Piesczek (former MP, former federal spokeswoman)
- Werner Kogler (federal spokesperson)
- Ulrike Lunacek (former MEP, former spokeswoman for foreign policy)
- Karl Oellinger (former MP, deputy federal speaker)
- Madeleine Petrovic (Club chairperson of the Lower Austrian Greens)
- Johannes Rauch, (Club chairperson and state speaker for Vorarlberg)
- Marie Ringler, (former Member of the Viennese state assembly, spokeswoman for culture and technology)
- Michaela Sburny (former MP, Spokeswoman for the economy, former Federal Executive Manager of the party)
- Terezija Stoisits (Ombudswoman, former MP and spokeswoman for minorities)
- Ingrid Lechner Sonnek (Club chairperson of the Styrian Greens)
- Alexander Van der Bellen (former Federal Speaker, club chairman in the National Council), President of Austria
- Maria Vassilakou (Club chairperson of the Viennese Greens, Vice Mayor)
- Georg Willi (Club chairperson and state speaker for the Tyrol)

=== Members of the European Parliament ===
- Thomas Waitz (MEP since 2020)
- Lena Schilling (MEP since 2024)
- Mercedes Echerer (MEP from 1999 to 2004)
- Eva Lichtenberger (MEP since 2004, member of the Austrian national convention)
- Johannes Voggenhuber (MEP from 1995 to 2009, Member of the European Convention, member of the Charter of Fundamental Rights of the European Union)
- Ulrike Lunacek (2009–2017)

== See also ==
- Green party
- Green politics
- List of environmental organizations
- Anti-nuclear movement in Austria
