= Spokesperson of The Greens – The Green Alternative =

Federal spokesman of the Green Party
- Bundessprecher der Grünen
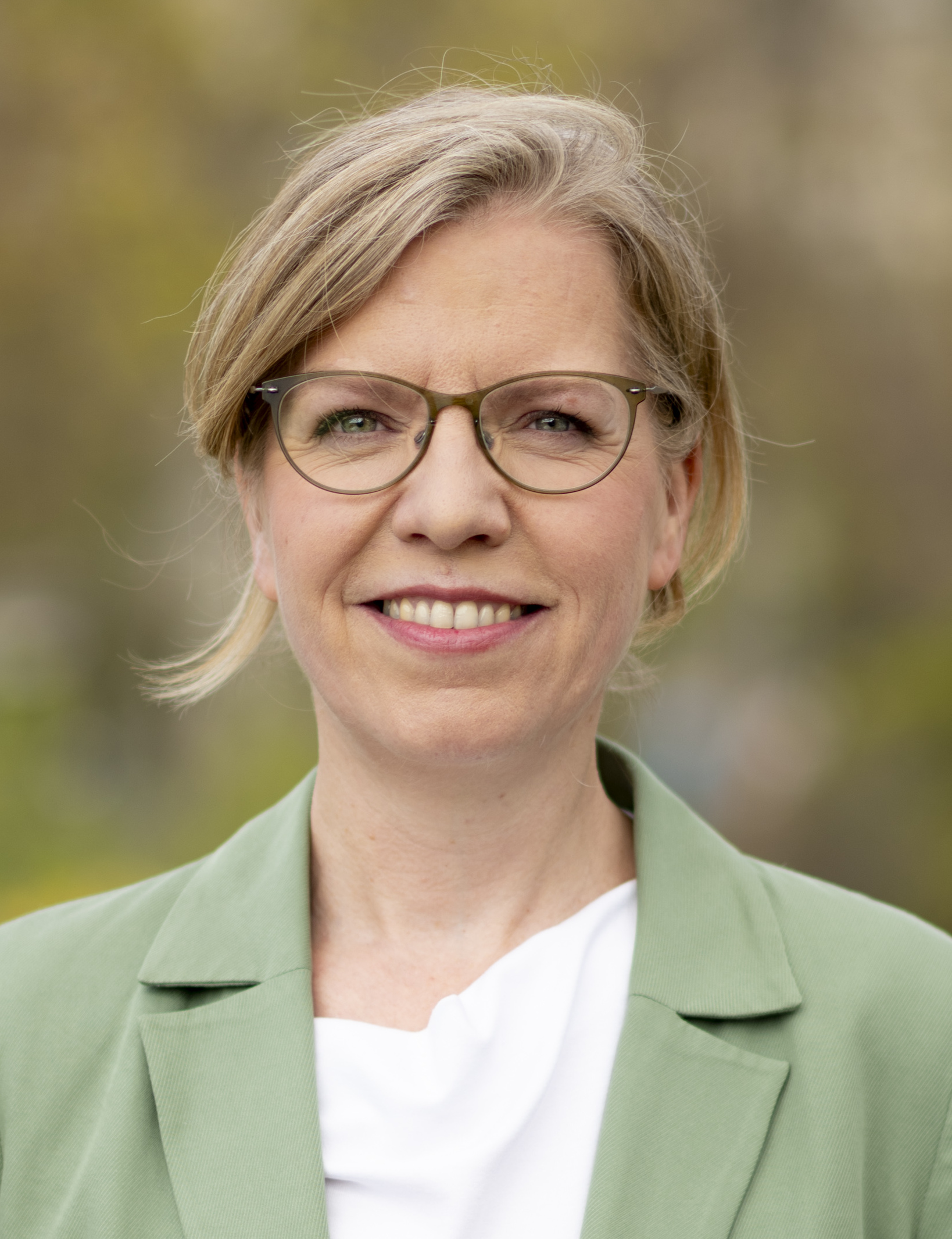
- Incumbent; Leonore Gewessler since 29 June 2025
- Executive board of the Green Party
- Status: Leader of a federal party
- Member of: Executive board Enhanced executive board
- Reports to: Bundeskongress
- Seat: Lindengasse 40, A-1071 Vienna
- Appointer: Bundeskongress
- Formation: 12 February 1987
- First holder: Freda Meissner-Blau
- Website: www.gruene.at

This is a list of federal spokespersons of The Greens – The Green Alternative, a political party in Austria.

| Portrait | Name | Took office | Left office | Notes | Chancellor |
|---|---|---|---|---|---|
| | Freda Meissner-Blau | 12 February 1987 | 6 December 1988 | | |
| | Johannes Voggenhuber | 6 December 1988 | 1992 | | |
| | Peter Pilz | 1992 | 1994 | | |
| | Madeleine Petrovic | 1994 | March 1996 | | |
| | Christoph Chorherr | March 1996 | December 1997 | | |
| | Alexander Van der Bellen | 13 December 1997 | 3 October 2008 | | |
| | Eva Glawischnig | 3 October 2008 | 18 May 2017 | | |
| | Ingrid Felipe | 26 June 2017 | 17 October 2017 | | |
| | Werner Kogler | 17 October 2017 | 29 June 2025 | | |
| | Leonore Gewessler | 29 June 2025 | Present | | |
