= Rudolf Burger =

Austrian philosopher (1938–2021)

Rudolf Burger (8 December 1938 – 19 April 2021) was an Austrian philosopher.

== Life and career ==
Burger was born in Vienna in the year of the occupation and the annexation of Austria into Nazi Germany, called Anschluss. His parents were active communists. He concluded his studies of physics at the Technical University in Vienna and thereafter served as an assistant at the Institute of Applied Physics, where he concluded his doctorate in 1965.

After working at the Ludwig Boltzmann Institute for Condensed Matter Physics in Vienna, Burger switched to the Battelle Institute in Frankfurt. There he was part of the team for research plannings. He also joined the Planning Commission of Germany's Federal Ministry of Education and Research in Bonn.

From 1973 to 1990 Burger headed the department for research in humanities and social sciences at the Austrian Ministry of Science. In 1979 Burger achieved his habilitation in sociology of scientific knowledge, in 1987 he became a professor at the University of Applied Arts in Vienna, where he was appointed to the chair for philosophy in 1991. From 1995 to 1999 Burger served as rector of this university. In 2007 he retired.

Since the 1980s Burger initiated or participated in several intellectual and political discussions in Austria. His essays are published in the daily newspaper Die Presse, in the weekly profil, as well as in intellectual magazines like FORVM, Leviathan or Merkur.

Burger died on 18 April 2021, aged 82.

== Status ==
Burger is well appreciated for his elegant style as an essayist and his avid love for intellectual criticism. His cynicism stirred some controversies, starting in 1990, when he opened the Günther Anders symposium of the city of Vienna by speaking of moralistic extortion, comparing Anders and Heidegger, equating their philosophies, and finally stating:

Though - as a biological species - the human is no value on itself, but rather - after the death of God - just a fact. It depends always only on the single being and the structure of the relations with those we live with, we love, we hate. And this surrounding is limited, also in the shadow of the bomb.

— Rudolf Burger, Opening Speech at the Günther Anders Symposium

Philosopher Konrad Paul Liessmann defended Anders and responded: [...] therefore the circumstances are dancing; but where is the rose?. In 1992 Burger both criticised Austria's foreign policy at the Balkans as warmonger (in German: kriegsgeil) and at the same time requested to let the parties of the war exsanguinate. These comments caused a nationwide controversy. In 2000 Burger criticised the Thursday Demonstrations against the Schüssel/Haider coalition as an antifascist carnival and again unchained a national debate. Finally, in 2001 he angered a lot of critical intellectuals with his request to forget and close the debates on guilt and remembrance. Historian Heribert Schiedel therefore named him the black and blue court philosopher, black referring to ÖVP, blue to FPÖ.

== Published works (selection) ==
- (ed., with Michael Benedikt): Die Krise der Phänomenologie und Pragmatik des Wissenschaftsfortschritts. Wien 1986
- Vermessungen. Essays zur Destruktion der Geschichte. Sonderzahl, Wien 1989, ISBN 3-85449-017-8.
- In der Zwischenzeit. Adnoten zu Politik und Philosophie. Springer, Wien und New York 1996, ISBN 3-211-82782-X.
- Ptolemäische Vermutungen. Aufzeichnungen über die Bahn der Sitten. Zu Klampen, Lüneburg 2001, ISBN 3-934920-06-3.
- Kleine Geschichte der Vergangenheit. Eine pyrrhonische Skizze der historischen Vernunft. Styria, Wien 2004, ISBN 3-222-13149-X.
- Re-Theologisierung der Politik? Wertedebatten und Mahnreden. Zu Klampen, Springe 2005, ISBN 3-934920-56-X.
- Im Namen der Geschichte. Vom Mißbrauch der historischen Vernunft. Zu Klampen, Springe 2007, ISBN 978-3-86674-015-0.
- Jenseits der Linie. Ausgewählte philosophische Erzählungen. Sonderzahl-Verlag, Wien 2008, ISBN 978-3-85449-304-4.
- Das Elend des Kulturalismus. Antihumanistische Betrachtungen. Zu Klampen, Springe 2011, ISBN 978-3-86674-147-8.
