= Jörg Mauthe =

Austrian writer, journalist and broadcasting executive

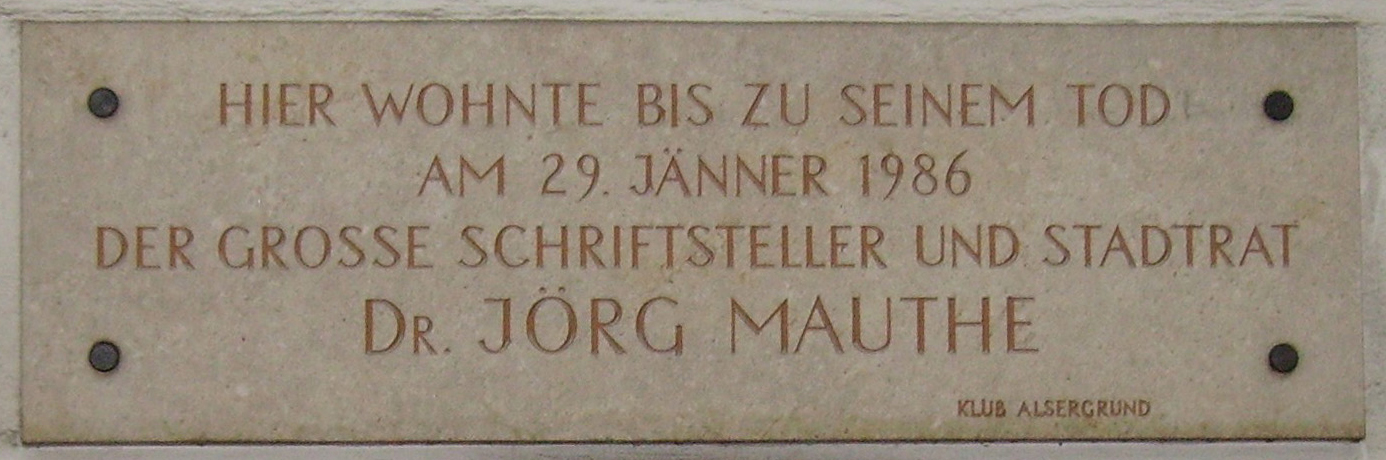
- Commemorative plaque on the house where Mauthe lived
- Born: 11 May 1924; Vienna
- Died: 29 January 1986 (aged 61); Vienna
- Known for: Writer, Journalist

Jörg Mauthe (1924–1986) was an Austrian writer, journalist and broadcasting executive. For some years he was prominent in the city politics of Vienna.

== Life ==
From 1947 he was working as a journalist, specialising from 1950 in cultural criticism for Die Furche, a conservative-leaning Austrian weekly newspaper. In 1955 he moved on to Die Presse where he was appointed culture editor.

Mauthe also worked, during its later years, for the US controlled Rot-Weiß-Rot (red-white-red, a reference to the Austrian flag) radio station, where he was in charge of the talk radio section (Abteilung Wort), and numbered among his colleagues Peter Weiser, Walter Davy and Ingeborg Bachmann. He was responsible for the conception of the series Die Radiofamilie (The Radio Family; they used Floriani as family name) and for the satirical weekly programme Der Watschenmann (literally The Slap Man) which ran from 1950 to 1955 (and was later revived on Austrian radio between 1967 and 1974 by Gerd Bacher). In 1967 he was appointed culture editor and Programme Planner for the ORF, Austria's national television broadcaster by Bacher, where he also contributed as a script-writer to programmes such as the Familie Leitner (Leitner Family) series and, in 1968, Die Donaugeschichten (The Danube Stories; the Austrian Publicity museum, Österreichischen Werbemuseum, holds a single episode of this 25-minute-long early evening classic series, both scripted and produced by Mauthe, and featuring among others Theo Lingen, Willy Millowitsch, Erich Padalewski and Walter Nießner). Later, in the 1980s, he provided scripts for the Familie Merian (Merian Family) series.

Jörg Mauthe: Published output
- Des Narren Abenteuer und Meinungen. With pen and ink drawings by the author. Wiener Verlag, Wien 1947.
- Zusammen mit Peter Weiser: Familie Floriani. Ein wienerischer Jahreslauf in dreißig Bildern. Nach der "Radiofamilie" des Senders "Rot-Weiß-Rot". With illustrations by Erni Kniepert. Kremayr & Scheriau, Wien 1954.
- Wiener Knigge. With notes by Rudolf Rhomberg. Andermann, Wien 1956.
  Neuauflage: Mit Illustrationen von Rudolf Rhomberg. Hunna, Wien 1965.
  How to be a Viennese. Illustrations by Rudolf Rhomberg. English translation by Majorie Kerr Wilson. Hunna, Wien 1966.
  Neuauflage: with notes by Rudolf Angerer. Amalthea, Wien 2007, ISBN 978-3-85002-060-2.
- Wien für Anfänger. Ein Lehrgang in 10 Lektionen. Mit Zeichnungen von Paul Flora. Diogenes, Zürich 1959.
  Neuauflage: Edition Löwenzahn, Innsbruck 2001, ISBN 3-7066-2270-X.
- Der gelernte Wiener. With notes by Wilfried Zeller-Zellenberg. Forum, Wien 1961.
- Together with Barbara Pflaum: Wie ist Wien. Hunna, Vienna 1961.
- … belieben zu speisen? Mit Zeichnungen von Wilfried Zeller-Zellenberg. Forum, Wien 1962.
- Die große Hitze oder Die Errettung Österreichs durch den Legationsrat Dr. Tuzzi. Molden, Wien 1974, ISBN 3-217-00605-4.
  Neuauflage: Edition Atelier, Wien 2011, ISBN 978-3-900-3791-00.
- Nachdenkbuch für Österreicher, insbesondere für Austrophile, Austromasochisten, Austrophobe und andere Austriaken. Molden, Wien 1975, ISBN 3-217-00702-6.
  Neuauflage: Edition Atelier, Wien 1987, ISBN 3-900379-11-4.
- Wien – Spaziergang durch eine Stadt. With photographs by Fred Peer. Residenz, Salzburg 1975.
  Neubearbeitete Auflage: Residenz, Salzburg 1979, ISBN 3-7017-0215-2.
- Die Vielgeliebte. Molden, Wien 1979, ISBN 3-217-00992-4.
  Neuauflage: Edition Atelier, Wien 2011, ISBN 978-3-900-3790-32.

posthumously published

- Demnächst oder Der Stein des Sisyphos. Edition Atelier, Wien 1986, ISBN 3-7008-0327-3.
  Neuauflage: Edition Atelier, Wien 2012, ISBN 3-900379-09-2
- Die Bürger von Schmeggs. Tagebuch eines Ortsunkundigen. With illustrations by Paul Flora. Edition Atelier, Wien 1989, ISBN 3-900379-30-0.
- Der Weltuntergang zu Wien und wie man ihn überlebt, austriakische Einsichten in zukünftige Aussichten. Edition Atelier, Wien 1989, ISBN 3-900379-35-1.

In 1975 Mauthe started to write a regular column for the Kurier, a Vienna-based daily newspaper.

Mauthe was not member of any political party, but he was persuaded for the ÖVP (Austrian People's Party), one of the three principal political parties in Austria, being a thoroughly Austrian equivalent of the English Conservative Party, by its Chairman of that time, Erhard Busek, to work with the ÖVP. Between 1978 and 1986 he was elected member on the City Council (Stadtsenat, the government of the State of Vienna), and till 1983 he was as well member of the Vienna Landtag (regional parliament), which meant that he was also a member of the Vienna Gemeinderat (community council).

As a city politician Mauthe championed causes that took his interest such as the city's image and the care of its many historical monuments and memorials, the revival of the old Wienerlieder (Vienna songs), the city's traditional Beisl (pub/restaurant) culture and the evolving Viennese cuisine. He inspired and guided various district and city festivals and celebrations. The return of the "Altwiener Christkindlmarkt" to the city's Freyung square, a Christmas Market inspired by the example of its eighteenth-century precursor, can be traced back to an idea from Jörg Mauthe.

During the 1984 Occupation of the Hainburger Au Mauthe, already recognized for his environmentalist credentials, sided with the occupiers who were opposing the proposed construction of a hydro-electric power plant, expected to destroy a large area of environmentally sensitive wetlands. For the (retrospectively dubbed) Animal's Press conference numerous environmentalist supporters of the "Konrad Lorenz-Referendum" dressed as animals: Mauthe himself turned up dressed as a black stork.

In 1975 Mauthe purchased the Burgruine Mollenburg, a small ruined castle near Weiten in Austria's Waldviertel region. Mauthe made a start on restoring the castle, doing much of the work himself with the help of his son. Jörg Mauthe's ashes are stored in the castle's keep.

In his literary works (especially in his two novels, "Die große Hitze"/"The Great Heat" and "Die Vielgeliebte"/"The Much Loved one") the protestant Mauthe is always concerned with what makes Austria, and especially Vienna, special in the broader context of German speaking "Middle Europe". The question arises as to whether Austrians, with their distinctive version of the German language and their catholic traditions, are permanently separate in terms of literature and life style from, and in some senses antagonistic to (what can be presented as) the protestant German mainstream.

== Recognition ==
- Theodor Körner Prize
- 1987: On the first anniversary of his death a plaque to his memory was unveiled on the outside of the house where he had lived at Günthergasse 1, in the Ninth District of central Vienna.
- 1987: Announcement of the "Dr. Jörg Mauthe Prize" for exemplary service to the Vienna cityscape.
- 1991: Designation of the "Jörg-Mauthe-Platz" (Jörg Mauthe Square) in the Ninth District of central Vienna.

== Reading list (Most of what is written about Mauthe is in German) ==
- Peter Bochskanl (Hrsg.): Jörg Mauthe. Sein Leben auf 33 Ebenen. Erinnerungen & Visionen. Edition Atelier, Vienna 1994, ISBN 3-900379-94-7.
- Edith J. Baumann: Der doppelte Spiegel. Jörg Mauthes „Die große Hitze“ und die „Vielgeliebte“; zwei literarische Utopien. Edition Atelier, Vienna 1995, ISBN 3-85308-009-X.
- Lotte Ingrisch: Das Donnerstagebuch. Österreichische Staatsdruckerei, Vienna 1996, ISBN 978-3-7046-0112-4. (Erstauflage Edition S, Österreichische Staatsdruckerei, Wien 1988, ISBN 3-7046-0112-8.)
- Club Niederösterreich (Hrsg.): Nachdenkbuch von Österreichern für Jörg Mauthe. Vienna 2006.
- Markus Kóth: „Aber es handelt sich eben um ein phantastisches Land“. Das Österreichbild in den literarischen Werken Jörg Mauthes – ein Beitrag zur Identitätsgeschichte der Zweiten Republik. Praesens, Wien 2009, ISBN 978-3-7069-0566-4.
- Felix Czeike: Historisches Lexikon Wien. Band 4: Le–Ro. Kremayr & Scheriau, Vienna 1995, ISBN 3-218-00546-9, S. 209.
- Günther Nenning: Dichter, Tod und Zwergerln. Jörg Mauthe – Erinnerungen an einen unbekannten österreichischen Poetenpolitiker. In: Die Zeit, Nr. 4/1992
