= Visit Beautiful Vietnam =

Visit Beautiful Vietnam: An ABC of Aggressions today
- Author: Günther Anders
- Original title: Visit Beautiful Vietnam: ABC der Aggressionen heute
- Genre: Essay
- Publisher: Pahl-Rugenstein Verlag (de)
- Publication date: 1968
- Publication place: Germany, Cologne (Köln)

Visit Beautiful Vietnam: An ABC of Aggressions today is a collection of essays by the German philosopher Günther Anders (i.e., Günther Stern; 1902–1992). The original edition was published in 1968 under the title Visit Beautiful Vietnam: ABC der Aggressionen heute by Pahl-Rugenstein in Cologne (Köln).

The author is said to have once remarked to Herbert Marcuse that the book was better than the first volume of his work The Outdatedness of Human Beings (Die Antiquiertheit des Menschen).

== Content ==
The work is structured as an Abecedarium, an alphabetically organized "ABC of Aggressions." In short essays, Anders addresses concepts and topics related to the Vietnam War. He draws comparisons between American military strategies in Vietnam and the methods of National Socialism, particularly regarding industrial-scale destruction, the use of oppressed populations as soldiers, and the propagandistic minimization of violence.

The style is essayistic and polemical. Anders aims not only to inform but also to provoke a moral reaction through historical analogies and pointed metaphors.

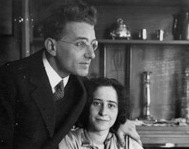
Günther Anders and Hannah Arendt (c. 1929)

== Context ==
By the 1960s, Anders was already a vocal critic of the Vietnam War and participated in the Russell Tribunal (Vietnam War Crimes Tribunal) in 1967, which investigated U.S. war crimes in Vietnam. In the foreword to the original edition, he warned about the potential use of tactical nuclear weapons. An expanded German edition - with a slightly changed title - was released in 2023 by CEP Europäische Verlagsanstalt, Hamburg, edited by Gerhard Oberschlick with an afterword by the German historian Bernd Greiner (de). The 2023 edition emphasizes the timelessness of his analyses, particularly in relation to modern warfare and geopolitical strategies.

== Reception ==
Visit Beautiful Vietnam is considered a provocative contribution to political philosophy, media critique, and war analysis. In literary criticism, Anders is often compared to theorists such as Hannah Arendt, who explored similar themes of power, propaganda, and violence. The 2023 German edition and a 2024 French translation highlight the ongoing relevance of his thought.

== Quotation ==
From the foreword:

„Nicht unmöglich, dass sich durch das Gelingen der vietnamesischen Offensive die Lage radikal zum Guten wendet, oder – wer weiß? – durch den Einsatz taktischer nuklearer Waffen radikal zum Schlimmen wenden werde. Und durchaus nicht undenkbar, dass sich unter Umständen die Frage erheben wird, ob denn die hier vorgelegten Analysen (unterstellt, sie seien zur Zeit ihrer Niederschrift gültig gewesen) auch heute noch gültig seien.“

"It is not impossible that the success of the Vietnamese offensive could radically turn the situation for the better, or—who knows?—that the use of tactical nuclear weapons could radically turn it for the worse. And it is by no means inconceivable that, under certain circumstances, the question may arise whether the analyses presented here (assuming they were valid at the time of their writing) are still valid today."

== See also ==
- My Lai Massacre
- War Crimes in Vietnam (Bertrand Russell)
- Harry Thürk

== Bibliography ==
- Günther Anders: Visit Beautiful Vietnam: ABC der Aggressionen heute. Pahl-Rugenstein, Köln 1968. (Inhalt)
- Günther Anders: Eskalation des Verbrechens. Aus einem ABC der amerikanischen Aggression gegen Vietnam. Union Verlag: Berlin (Ost) 1971. (With partial reprints and new original contributions, revised licensed edition for the GDR.) (Content)
- Günther Anders: Visit Beautiful Vietnam. ABC der Aggressionen (damals wie heute). Erweiterte Neuedition mit einem Nachwort von Bernd Greiner: Die Aktualität von Günther Anders. Hrsg. Gerhard Oberschlick. EVA, Hamburg 2023, ISBN 978-3-86393-161-2. (This edition incorporates the 13 sections originally written for Eskalation des Verbrechens, as well as three additional relevant texts, which appeared in the Viennese Tagebuch in January 1969 and in Das Argument in April 1969.) (partial view Online partial view)
- Günther Anders: Visit Beautiful Vietnam: Chronique des agressions contemporaines. Les Belles Lettres, Paris 2024, ISBN 9782251455754 (French translation)
- Günther Anders: Nürnberg und Vietnam. Voltaire-Verlag, Berlin [1967] (2. Aufl. 1968) – Online: Nürnberg und Vietnam. Synoptisches Mosaik im Anders-Archiv des FORVM (Voltaire-Flugschriften 6)
