= Nenning =

Nenning may refer to:

- Günther Nenning (1921−2006), Austrian journalist
- Nenning (Middle-earth), a fictional river in J. R. R. Tolkien's legendarium
