= Promethean gap =

Philosophical concept by Günther Anders

The Promethean gap (German: prometheisches Gefälle) is a concept concerning the relations of humans and technology and a growing "asynchronization" between them. In popular formulations, the gap refers to an inability or incapacity of human faculties to imagine the effects of the technologies that humans produce, specifically the negative effects. The concept originated with philosopher Günther Anders in the 1950s and for him, an extreme test case was the atomic bomb and its use at Hiroshima and Nagasaki in 1945, a symbol of the larger technology revolution that the 20th century was witnessing. The gap has been extended to and understood within multiple variations – a gap between production and ideology; production and imagination; production and need; production and use; technology and the body; doing and imagining; and doing and feeling. The gap can also be seen in areas such as law and in the actions of legislatures and policymakers.

Various authors use different words to explain Gefälle, accordingly resulting in Promethean divide, Promethean disjunction, Promethean discrepancy, Promethean gradient, Promethean slope, Promethean decline, Promethean incline, Promethean disparity, Promethean lag, and Promethean differential.

== Origin ==
Günther Anders (1902–1992), born in Germany and of Jewish descent, attempted to conceptualize the discrepancy between humans and technology based on his observations and hands-on experience as an émigré in the United States, and his general theoretical background in Marxist concepts such as substructure and superstructure. In the United States, he did various jobs. He was a tutor, a factory worker, and even a Hollywood costume designer. By the 1950s conceptualizing this discrepancy had become an important and pervasive part of his writings and would remain a feature of his work until his death. In the 1980s he would go on to call his philosophy a philosophy of discrepancy (Diskrepanzphilosophie).

The first published usage of the phrase was in the first volume of Anders's book The Outdatedness of Human Beings (German: Die Antiquiertheit des Menschen) published in the German language in 1956. Gunther uses exaggeration when explaining the concept of the Promethean gap and the associated concepts of Promethean shame (and pride) and states that there is a necessity and urgency for the exaggeration. Human "blindness" amidst the increasing gradient demanded it. The aim then became to expand humans' capacity and ability to imagine. In Burning Conscience (1961), letters between US airman Claude Eatherly and Gunther, Gunther writes,

your task consists in bridging the gap that exists between your two faculties... to level off the incline... you have to violently widen the narrow capacity of your imagination (and the even narrower one of your feelings) until imagination and feeling become capable to grasp and to realize the enormity of your doings; until you are capable to seize and conceive, to accept or reject it—in short: your task is: to widen your moral fantasy.

Gunther considered the service members of the US Army Air Forces unit 509th Composite Group, which conducted the atomic bombings of Hiroshima and Nagasaki, and of which Eatherly was a part, as an example of people affected by the Promethean gap. Along with the atomic bombings, Auschwitz (representing the Holocaust) was an example from the same time period, both represented technology enabled conditions of large scale mechanized death, a new era which required conceptualizing as a basis of future prevention. Gunther took these two examples of advances in civilization under the same umbrella of mechanization, taking note that the atomic bombings and Auschwitz differed in a key point of distance between the individuals involved which accordingly influenced his interaction with the atomic bombings. An increasingly networked technologization is seeing increasing sophistication in all forms which our human faculties are unable to keep up with, we are "unable to imagine the things we make", an inversion of before.

=== Prometheus ===
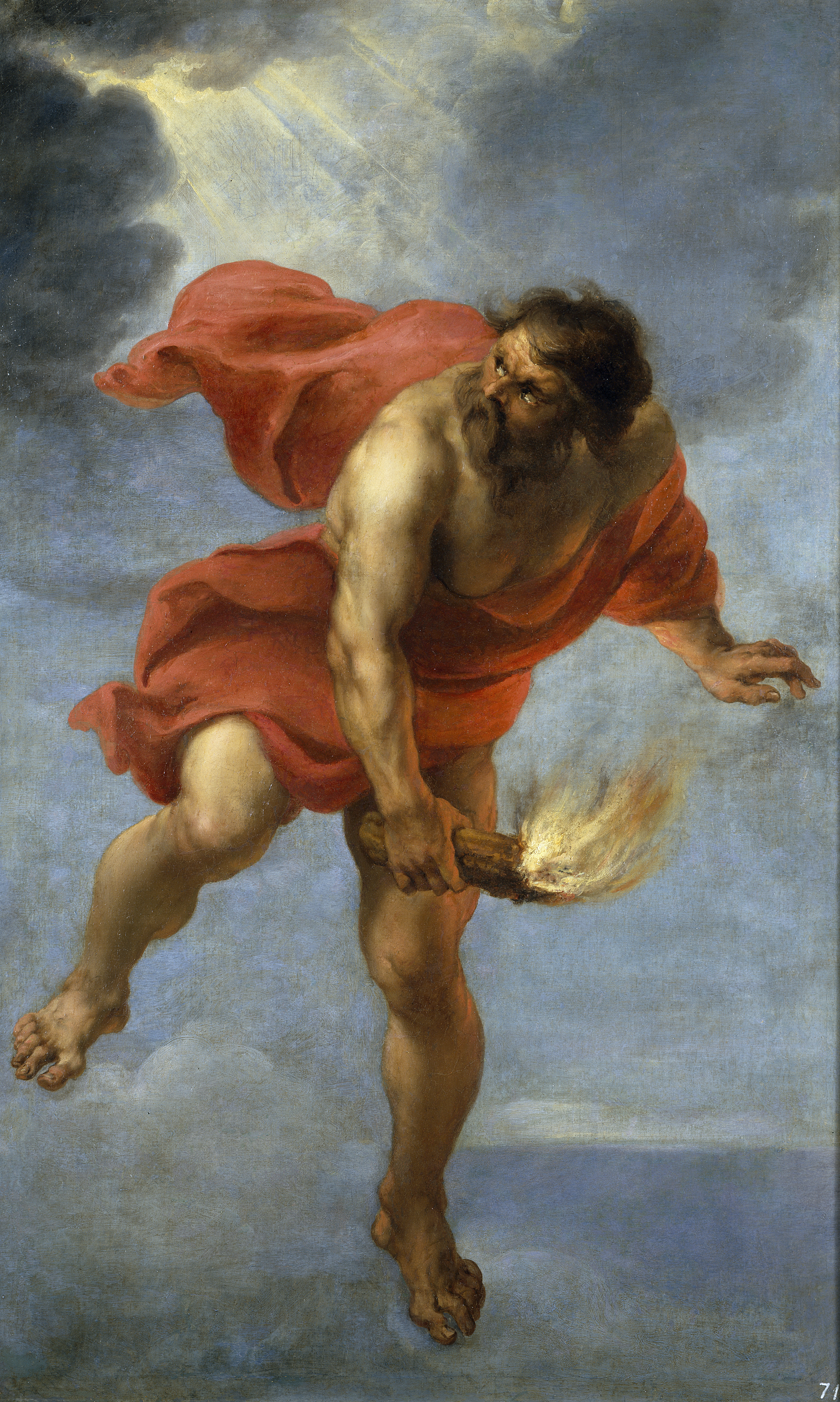
Prometheus carrying fire

The word "Promethean" has been taken from the Greek myth of Prometheus. There are a number of stories attached to him along with variations of the stories.

Prometheus, a Titan and a trickster, created primitive versions of humanity. He created them in the image of the Greek gods, however Zeus limited the powers of humanity. Following this, Prometheus tricked Zeus, at least twice. The first deception by Prometheus resulted in Zeus confiscating fire from humanity. Prometheus, in retaliation, stole fire from Mount Olympus and gave it back to humanity. When humanity flourished once again and Zeus saw that they had been given fire, he eternally punished Prometheus. Anders uses this story as symbolism, where the fire is modern technology and the eternal punishment given to Prometheus the negative consequences.

The convergence of the variations in the story is the gift of fire. Through this gift, humanity can now play its own tricks, for both good or bad. In variations of the story, Heracles unchains Prometheus, and the story of Pandora and her jar follows.
