= FORVM =

Defunct cultural and political magazine in Austria (1954–1995)

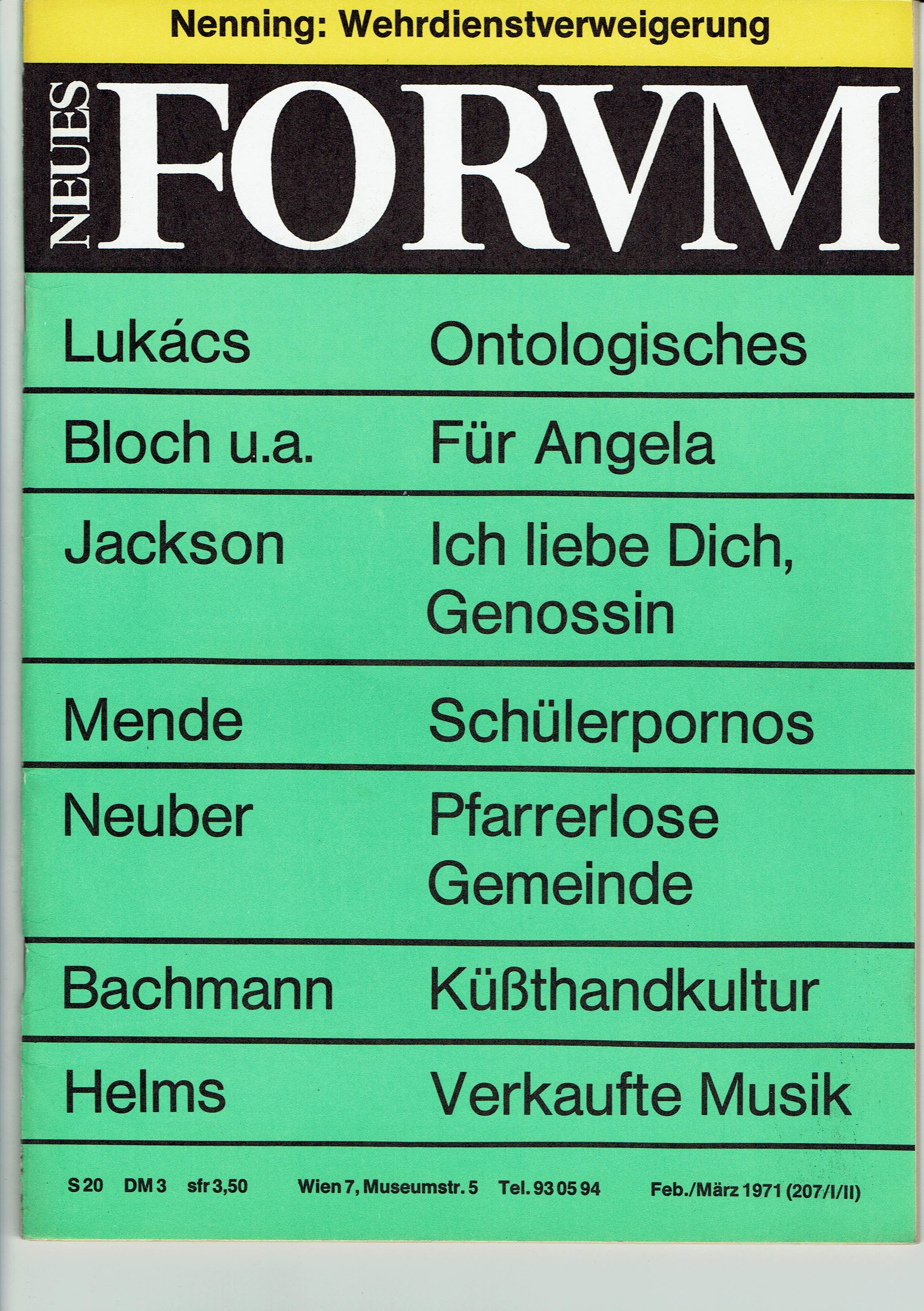
Forvm Magazine in 1971

FORVM was an Austrian monthly cultural and political magazine, published in Vienna from 1954 to 1995, founded by Friedrich Hansen-Loeve, Felix Hubalek, Alexander Lernet-Holenia and Friedrich Torberg with the financial and logistical support of the CIA-funded Congress for Cultural Freedom (CCF). Torberg also edited the magazine from its start in 1954 to 1965. In 1965 Günther Nenning took over as editor and in 1986 Gerhard Oberschlick.

The magazine was distributed internationally and instigated ideological debates. In 1995, the magazine closed down due to financial difficulties. In 2004 a complete reprint was published.

== History ==
=== Friedrich Torberg era (1954–1965) ===
In 1966, 12 years after the foundation of FORVM, publications including The New York Times, Ramparts, and Saturday Evening Post reported that the magazine's funding came from the U.S. Central Intelligence Agency (CIA), with the aim of undermining leftist groups of intellectuals around the world and turning them against communism as part of the Cultural Cold War. The CIA website states that "[t]he Congress for Cultural Freedom is widely considered one of the CIA's more daring and effective Cold War covert operations."

Other magazines funded by the CCF included Der Monat in Western Berlin, Preuves in Paris, Tempo Presente in Rome, Cuadernos in Paris, Encounter in London, as well as Freedom First in Bombay, Solidarity in the Philippines, Quadrant in Australia, Hiwar (magazine) in Lebanon, Examen in Mexico, and others.

FORVM was never an easy partner to its sponsors. Its first issue had already caused controversy by printing an argument between Friedrich Heer and editor Friedrich Torberg, called "Conversation with the Enemy," about the legitimacy of discourse with Eastern bloc communists. Heer was for such dialogue, whereas Torberg opposed any contact with the "enemy". Although Torberg was said to have lost the debate, he nevertheless succeeded - using FORVM as a weapon - to force all major Austrian theaters to boycott the plays of Bertolt Brecht, an avowed Marxist. This lasted until 23 February 1963, when the Wiener Volkstheater dared to stage Mutter Courage und ihre Kinder. Although the magazine focused mainly on theater and literature, FORVM also printed notable dialogues between church and state, discourses between the dominating ideologies of the time, and important texts on social sciences. But the rigid and fierce anti-communism of Torberg increasingly became a problem to the magazine's sponsors, who repeatedly warned the editor, then limited their funding in 1961, then finally stopped support entirely in 1964. When the new financier of FORVM, Hans Deutsch, also pulled back in 1965, Torberg decided to give up his position. Nenning, who had served as editor-in-chief since 1958, became the new owner and editor.

=== Günther Nenning era (1966–1986) ===
Günther Nenning declared himself to be a "Christian and socialist," and opened FORVM to leftist thoughts and ideas. Due to Torberg's opposition to this change, Nenning had to rename the magazine to NEUES FORVM (New Forvm) until Torberg died in 1979. Nenning raised the circulation from 2,700 to nearly 30,000. When the magazine published de Sade's Philosophy in the Bedroom in 1970, with commentary by Michael Siegert, the Ministry of the Interior reacted harshly, confiscating the magazine. This step was later declared unconstitutional, leading to the end of government censorship in Austria. The Nenning years were dominated by hearty discussions about Austria's constitution and neutrality, the law of nature, Vergangenheitsbewältigung, the sexual revolution, Viennese Actionism, and terrorism.

From 1973 to 1982 Michael Siegert served as editor-in-chief. Even more than Torberg or Nenning before him, Siegert heavily adapted some of the articles FORVM printed, thereby angering some authors. Nenning formally kept his position as owner and editor, but from 1973 on the magazine was published by an "association of the journalists and employees." In 1982, Gerhard Oberschlick took over as editor-in-chief, but was dismissed by Nenning in 1984 for insubordinate behavior. The main points of controversy were Nennings' cooperation with conservative publicists and politicians, as well as the secret funding of the Konrad Lorenz Referendum by Hans Dichand and his Kronen Zeitung. Nenning consequently established FORVM as the voice of the fundamental green movement, and the circulation dropped dramatically (to 1,700), putting FORVM close to bankruptcy. In 1985 Nenning was expelled from the union and the Social Democratic Party of Austria. In 1986 he sold the magazine to Gerhard Oberschlick.

=== Gerhard Oberschlick era (1986–1995) ===
The new editor quickly had to reposition the magazine. Rule of law and human rights became central issues, Günther Anders the most prominent author. The circulation gained ground and reached up to 25.000. The presidency of Kurt Waldheim and the constant flirting of Jörg Haider with Nazi ideology opened a wide field of discussion and controversy. FORVM served as a stable lighthouse of anti-fascism, avidly opposing any kind of racism and xenophobia. In 1992 Hans Lebert received the Grillparzer Award, donated by German Alfred Toepfer in German Marks. Although ill and not able to participate in the ceremony, Lebert wrote an ardent speech, read by actor Wolfgang Gasser, famous for his performance in a play by Thomas Bernhard at the Burgtheater. In it Lebert warned against the attempts of a new Anschluss, culminating in the exclaim: "Austrians, save your country yourselves!" The speech caused a scandal, the German ambassador Philipp Jenninger was upset and left early, and Oberschlick, who had printed the speech secretly, had it distributed - as a special issue of FORVM - at the end of the ceremony at the University of Vienna.

== Relevant authors ==
- Theodor W. Adorno
- Günther Anders
- Roland Barthes
- Simone de Beauvoir
- Heinrich Böll
- Christian Broda
- Rudolf Burger
- Elias Canetti

- Eldridge Cleaver
- Rudi Dutschke
- Josef Dvorak
- Erich Fried
- Erich Fromm
- Roger Garaudy
- Jean Genet
- Michael Guttenbrunner

- Friedrich Heer
- Adolf Holl
- Ivan Illich
- Hans Kelsen
- Cardinal Franz König
- Bruno Kreisky
- Norbert Leser
- György Ligeti

- Georg Lukács
- Herbert Marcuse
- Robert Menasse
- Christian Michelides
- Ladislav Mňačko
- Manfred Nowak
- Olof Palme
- Heidi Pataki

- Erwin Ringel
- Ota Šik
- Ignazio Silone
- Manès Sperber
- Peter Turrini
- Oswald Wiener
- Simon Wiesenthal
- Carl Zuckmayer

== Publications ==
- Reprint FORVM 1954-1995. Ueberreuter, Wien 2001-2004, 28 volumes plus registry, ISBN 3-8000-3834-X, AU 0568 (complete edition)
- Wissenschaft und Freiheit [Science and Freedom]. Edited by the Congress for Cultural Freedom. International Congress in Hamburg, July 23−26, 1953, in cooperation with Universität Hamburg. Grunewald, Berlin 1954.
