= Gerhard Oberschlick =

Austrian essayist

Gerhard Fritz Oberschlick (born August 30, 1942 in Irschen) is an Austrian essayist. From 1985 to 1995 he was the editor of the political and cultural magazine FORVM. Today he serves as the literary executor of Günther Anders.

== Life and career ==
After high school in Klagenfurt, Oberschlick studied German literature, history of theatre and philosophy at the University Vienna. 1966/67 he edited the students paper en face and then served as an accounting clerk of three university institutes, as well as secretary of philosopher Erich Heintel. In 1969 he dissociated from the university because of Heintel's acceptance of the death penalty and the Vietnam War. He joined the publishing house of NEUES FORVM and organized a petition for a referendum to abolish the Austrian military, that had been initiated by Wilfried Daim and Günther Nenning. The referendum was never carried out, although it was registered in 1970 and Oberschlick had succeeded to procure the obligatory number of 30.000 supporters. The reasons for the withdrawal were that socialist Bruno Kreisky had caught the momentum and won the 1970 elections with the slogan "Six months of military service is enough!" and that Nenning and other supporters were in fear to lose the vote and embarrass the cause. Nevertheless the failed attempt caused major upheaval and a scandal in the conservative circles of Austria - and it is today recalled as the major achievement of the Movement of 1968 in Austria. At last the Anti-military referendum caused FORVM founder Friedrich Torberg to distance himself from the magazine with these words: The new FORVM is the magazine against which the old one was founded.

Starting in 1971 Oberschlick organized a music festival with Friedrich Gulda in Ossiach and two scientific symposia for the Kreisky government in Vienna, created a Happening and worked as a dramaturge for plays by Ibsen and Pirandello.

In 1975 he returned to FORVM as a publishing manager, 1982/83 he served as editor-in-chief and in 1986 he became the owner and editor of the magazine. During his editorship FORVM retained its high profile through intellectual and social criticism, avid anti-fascism and its fight for human rights. Oberschlick became well known for his judicial controversies with right wing FPÖ politicians like Jörg Haider - mainly because of their racism or their nostalgia for the NSDAP regime. At the European Court of Human Rights (ECHR) Oberschlick achieved several verdicts against the Republic of Austria because of violation of the freedom of speech, and this caused finally in 1995 a change of Austria's criminal law. Since then Austria's high courts are bound to all decisions of the ECHR, therefore implementing human rights in the legal system of the country.

Since 1992 he has served as the literary executor of philosopher and anti-nuclear activist Günther Anders. In June 1995 Oberschlick chaired the International Human Rights Tribunal. His co-chair was environmental activist Freda Meissner-Blau, and human rights activist Christian Michelides served as the attorney general. The tribunal was dedicated to the persecution of lesbians, gays, bisexuals and transgender persons in Austria during the period from 1945 to 1995. As a consequence of this endeavour and other efforts all discriminating laws against LGBT-persons in Austria have been abolished between 1996 and 2005.

At the end of 1995 Oberschlick had to close down FORVM due to lack of financial means. Since 2000 he has edited a modest internet issue of the former magazine.

In 2022, together with Meral Şimşek, he received the Theodor Kramer Prize for Writing in Resistance and Exile.

In 2023, Gerhard Oberschlick resigned from the International Günther Anders Society Vienna, which he co-founded in 2012, following internal disputes, and stipulated that, "in accordance with his wishes," its newly elected chairman, Christian Dries, was no longer permitted to publish any of Anders' writings.

== Publications ==
- (ed., with Marietta Torberg): Die Zukunft von Wissenschaft und Technik in Österreich [The Future of Science and Engineering in Austria]. Europa Verlag, Vienna 1973.
- (ed.): FORVM, Internationale Zeitschrift für kulturelle Freiheit, politische Gleichheit und solidarische Arbeit [International magazine for cultural freedom, political equality and solidary labour], Issue 387-394 bis 499-504 (September 30, 1986 till December 6, 1995) Vienna ISSN 0028-3622.
  - (ed.): FORVM 1987-1995. In: Reprint FORVM 1954-1995. Ueberreuter, Vienna 2004, ISBN 3-8000-3963-X.
- (ed.): Günther Anders, Obdachlose Skulptur. Über Rodin. Beck, Munich 1994, ISBN 3-406-37450-6.
- (ed.): Günther Anders, Über Heidegger. With a text by Dieter Thomä and two translations by Werner Reimann. Beck, Munich 2001, ISBN 3-406-48259-7.

== See also ==
- Visit Beautiful Vietnam
