= Clara Stern =

German psychologist and writer (1877–1945)

- Born: Clara Joseephy; March 12, 1877; Berlin, Germany
- Died: December 8, 1945 (aged 68); New York City, New York, U.S.
- Occupation: Psychologist
- Spouse: William Stern (m. 1899; died 1938)
- Children: 3, including Günther Anders

Clara Stern (née Joseephy; March 12, 1877 – 1945) was a German developmental psychologist.

== Biography ==
Clara was born into a wealthy Jewish family and was one of seven children. Her father was a banker named Julius Joseephy and her mother's name was Friederike Joseephy (née Benjamin). Clara and William met in 1897 while on a bicycle ride through Forst Grunewald in Berlin, Germany. They married in 1899 despite the opposition of Clara's parents due to the fact that William had little money to provide for them. They then moved to Breslau, Germany which is now Wrocław, Poland. The Sterns went on to have three children, the first being a daughter named Hilde (1900–1962), then a son named Günther (1902–1992), followed by their last daughter named Eva (1904–1992).

== Work in child development ==
Clara and William Stern greatly influenced the growing field of child development. They studied the language development of their three children for 18 years by keeping detailed diaries from the day each child was born until they were 12, 10, and 7 years old, respectively. All together, there are 24 diaries with almost 5,000 handwritten pages of notes. The data that they recorded included reactions, babbling, the ability to recall events, lying and moral judgment. They also studied the children's development by conducting experiments that involved asking questions that tested linguistic development, memory, and truth telling.

In addition to the detailed diaries of language development, the Sterns systematically recorded one-on-one sessions with each child. One parent would begin storytelling, while the other parent, typically Clara, would take detailed notes. By evaluating their cumulative observations of all three children, the Sterns founded the concept of "game theory", which states that a child's personal development depends on the quality of the child's play.

Some of their work was groundbreaking, according to Görlitz:

During the second year of life, for example, almost all children begin to designate themselves or other people linguistically. Children growing up in a German-speaking environment differ in terms of whether their first self-designation consists of a name or a pronoun. Clara and William Stern discovered that their firstborn (a daughter) first designated herself with a name, whereas her two younger siblings started designating themselves with a pronoun. Ninety years later, this sibling effect, first discovered in case studies from just one family, has been replicated in large samples taken from different cultures and languages.

It has since been reported that the Stern children were not aware of their parents studying them, and only became aware of the research after the studies had been published. This is an important fact to note because their obliviousness to the study ensures the recording of natural behaviors from the children.

Despite Clara's lack of a formal higher education, she and her husband conducted their research together, with Clara even publishing essays of her own. It has been argued that her most important contribution to their joint studies was the immensely detailed diaries she kept for 18 years, as Clara was the one who bore that burden, not William.

Their research is also interesting for another reason, because it is possibly the first German example of an academic co-operation between a husband and wife. Such working relationships have been described as following "the partner model" in which a woman works in private collaboration with her husband or partner. Clara and William fit into this category because Clara never received money for her work, the status of an employee, nor did she ever work in an office with her husband; she only worked from their home.

When the Sterns began publishing their findings, there were originally plans for a series of six books to be written. Child Language was the first text and was published in 1907, the second text Recollection, Testimony & Lying was published in 1909. These two texts were major additions to the growing literature of developmental psychology. The remaining books - Regarding and Representing, Child's Play, Will and Emotional Life, Thinking and Beliefs - were never published and Clara and William Stern never worked together on a joint publication after that.

However, in 1914, William Stern published a textbook titled Psychology of Early Childhood and he acknowledged his wife's contributions to the work even though she did not appear as a co-author. The subtitle reads: "Supplemented by extracts from the unpublished diaries of Clara Stern."

=== Recollection, Testimony & Lying (1909) ===
The last text the Sterns published together, Recollection, Testimony & Lying (1909) has been of continued interest for many scholars in developmental psychology because of its lasting relevance. This is a detailed examination of the relation between children's statements and the truth based on the observations collected in the diaries.

This work has not only been useful for the field of developmental psychology, but has also been used for legal matters. Such as determining when a child is old enough to testify truthfully in court.

In their writing, the Sterns point out that when children do not know what they are saying is false, then it cannot be a lie. Also, if a child knows something is false but there is no intention to deceive, then that is not a lie; this is what they call a "pseudo-lie". An example of this would be a child playing pretend, because the children are aware of the falseness of what is being said, but there is no intention to deceive.

From their investigations the Sterns concluded that when the stage of development in which children are able to make accurate statements in an adult sense is reached, then children can become capable of lying. The Sterns also concluded that lying is not an innate behavior and children learn to lie through an interaction with their environment and certain natural tendencies, like playing pretend.

Their advice on how to prevent the development of lying involves the idea of introception, which they state as the parents being good role models for their children and they themselves not lying, or have their children lie for them.

== The Stern children ==
The Stern children went on to all take different paths with their lives. Hilde became a social worker and was a left-wing activist. She was arrested in 1934 for hiding two communist friends, and was committed to socialism and the peace movement until her death. Günther became the most well known out of the three siblings. He adopted the pseudonym Günther Anders and published works advocating for world peace and opposing nuclear weapons. The youngest Stern sibling Eva was involved with the Youth Aliyah movement which rescued Jewish children from the Nazis.

== Emigration ==
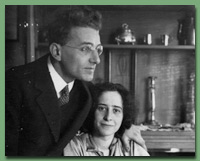
Günther (Stern) Anders and his wife Hannah Arendt (c. 1929)

With the domination of governmental power in Germany by the Nazis in 1933, Jewish scholars were systematically removed from their professional positions and William Stern was forced to give up management of his psychological institute and his functions on all committees at the University of Hamburg. Warned by their 31-year-old son Günther that Hitler's ultimate aim was the extermination of the Jews, the Stern couple went into exile abroad, first to the Netherlands and then to the United States. Duke University in Durham, North Carolina offered William Stern a professorship in the Department of Psychology that ensured the couple's livelihood.

William Stern is widely remembered as the originator of the Intelligence Quotient (I.Q.). He died March 27, 1938, in Durham.

Clara Stern died in 1945 in New York, United States.

== Writings ==
The results of the Stern's collaborative research were summarized in their three books, which listed Clara as first author.

- Clara and William Stern: The Children's Language. 1907, (Reprint Scientific Book Society Darmstadt, 1987)
- Clara and William Stern: Memory, Statement and Lies in the First Childhood. 1908
- Clara and William Stern: Psychology of Early Childhood up to the Sixth Year. 1914 (Clara Stern translated the third edition of this book into English and that text was published in 1924.)

== Honors ==
According to James Lamiell, "Bestowed posthumously on Clara Stern at the Max Planck Institute for Psycholinguistics in Nijmegen, Holland... one can view the busts of nine individuals judged by a panel of distinguished scientists to have made extraordinary contributions to the discipline of psycholinguistics. The eight busts alongside that of Clara Stern are those of (in alphabetical order) Paul Broca, Karl Bühler, F. C. Donders, Roman Jakobson, Edward Sapir, William Stern, Carl Wernicke, and Wilhelm Wundt – all widely known and highly respected historical luminaries, and all males."

== External sources ==
- Deutsch W. (2011) Clara Stern: Living for science as a woman and mother. In: Volkmann-Raue S., Lück H. (eds) Important psychologists of the 20th century. VS Publishing house for social sciences: https://link.springer.com/chapter/10.1007/978-3-531-93064-0_8 (in German)
- Werner Deutsch & Christliebe El Mogharbel (2011) Clara and William Stern's conception of a developmental science, European Journal of Developmental Psychology, 8:2, 135-156, DOI: 10.1080/17405629.2010.537548
- Sibylle Volkmann-Raue (ed.): Important psychologists. Biographies and writings. Beltz-Vlg, Weinheim 2002, ISBN 3-407-22136-3
