= Tone variator =

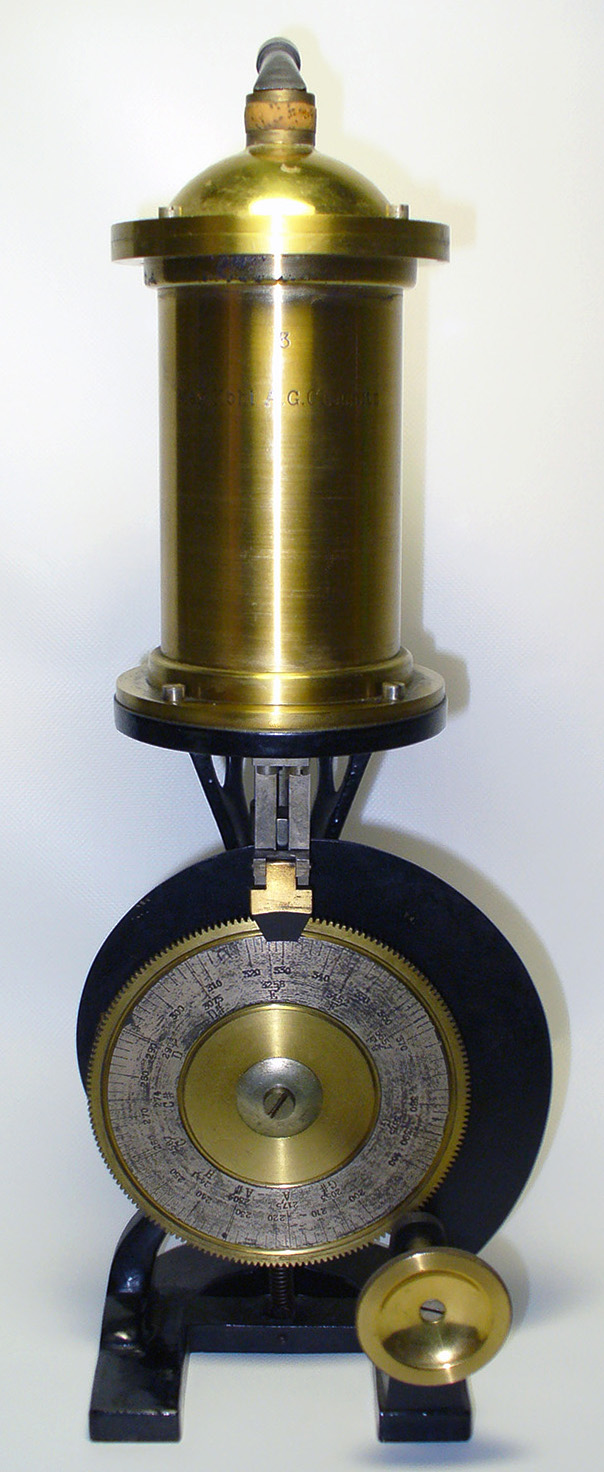
Tone variator by Max Kohl, Chemnitz, Germany

Tone variator with rack and pinion design.

German psychologist William Stern invented the tone variator in 1897 to study human sensitivity to changes in pitch, going beyond the traditional psychophysical research of studying the sensitivity to differences in discrete tones. The instrument consists of an adjustable brass resonator, which is supplied with a constant flow of air across the opening at the top. Turning a graduated cam on the front of the apparatus raises or lowers a piston in the bottom of the resonator, changing the volume of its interior, thus altering the sounded pitch over a continuous range.

The spiral-shaped cam is such that equal angles of rotation approximately correspond to equal changes in frequency. A dial on the front of the cam indicates the current resonance frequency and musical tone of the instrument.

Subsequent improvements to the device include the addition by G. M. Whipple of a gasometer, in order to regulate the incoming air supply. A version of the device was also produced in which the bottom of the resonator was not displaced by a spiral, but by rack and pinion (see figure); in these, an eccentrically-operated pointer is used to indicate the frequency on the scale.

The instrument has been used in demonstrations, for tuning other instruments, and for research in psychology and otology. According to Stern, his research in the "apperception of change" began a "decisive metamorphosis" in his understanding:

The issue [apperception of change] was raised by a psycho-physical proposition: I wanted to discover the 'sensitivity,' not as Fechner and his successors, for two barely distinguishable constant stimuli, but for the continuous change of one stimulus into another. At first I conceived the problem in purely sensationist terms, sought to determine thresholds experimentally, raised the question of the possible existence of 'transition feelings,' etc. Soon, however, the sphere of my inquiry widened in the direction of descriptive and humanistic problems.

— — Stern, W. (1930). Autobiographical Essay in A History of Psychology in Autobiography, Murchinson, Carl (ed.) Vol. 1. Worcester, Mass: Clark University Press.

== See also ==
- Variator
- Medicine and Health
- Audiology
- Tuning fork
- Cavity resonator

== External articles and further reading ==
General references

- "Tone variator". Brass Instrument Psychology. University of Toronto. URL accessed 2006-07-01.
- Kohl, Max. Physical Apparatus / Vol. II. Apparatus and Supplies for General Use. Introduction to Physics. Mechanics. Wave Theory. Acoustics. Optics. Heat. Meteorology. Cosmology. Chemnitz, Germany. p 446.

Publications

- W. Stern, Autobiographical Essay in A History of Psychology in Autobiography, Murchinson, Carl (ed.) Vol. 1. Worcester, Mass: Clark University Press.
- Rand Evans, "The Just Noticeable Difference: Psychophysical instrumentation and the determination of sensory thresholds". Proceedings of the Eleventh International Scientific Instrument Symposium, Bologna University, Italy, 9–14 September 1991.
- Titchener, "Experimental Psychology, a Manual of Experimental Practice: Volume II", Quantitative Experiments, Part II. Instructor's Manual. New York: MacMillan. p. 139.
- G. M. Whipple, "An analytic study of the memory image and the process of judgment in the discrimination of clangs and tones". American Journal of Psychology, vol. 12, pp. 409–457; vol. 13, pp. 219–268.
- Guy Montrose Whipple, "Studies in pitch discrimination". American Journal of Psychology, Volume 14, pages 289–309, 1903
- RF Wyatt, "A New Instrument for Measuring Pitch Discrimination". The American Journal of Psychology, Volume 48, Issue 2, 1936. Pg 335. ISSN 0002-9556
- Love, Beryl F.; Dawson, Margaret K. (1 June 1919). "The Variation in Sound Intensity of Resonators and Organ Pipes with Blowing Pressure". Physical Review. 14 (1). American Physical Society (APS): 49–53. Bibcode:1919PhRv...14...49L. doi:10.1103/physrev.14.49. ISSN 0031-899X.

Websites

- "Virtual Laboratory of Psychology: Instruments: Stern Variator". fh-potsdam.de (ed. the viewer gives a rotating view of the image)
- "Tone variator". phys.cwru.edu.
- "Stern’s Tone variator, 1897". scienceandsociety.co.uk.
