= William Stern (psychologist) =

German psychologist and philosopher (1871–1938)

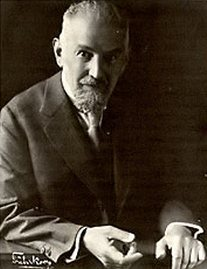
- Born: Ludwig Wilhelm Stern; April 29, 1871; Berlin, German Empire
- Died: March 27, 1938 (aged 66); Durham, North Carolina, U.S.
- Education: University of Berlin (PhD, 1893)
- Occupation: Psychologist
- Spouse: Clara Joseephy (m. 1899)
- Children: 3, including Günther Anders

Louis William Stern (born Ludwig Wilhelm Stern; April 29, 1871 – March 27, 1938) was a German American psychologist and philosopher who originated personalistic psychology, which placed emphasis on the individual by examining measurable personality traits as well as the interaction of those traits within each person to create the self.

Stern coined the term intelligence quotient (IQ) and invented the tone variator as a new way to study human perception of sound. Stern studied psychology and philosophy under Hermann Ebbinghaus at the Humboldt University of Berlin, and quickly moved on to teach at the University of Breslau. Later, he was appointed to the position of professor at the University of Hamburg.

Over the course of his career, Stern authored many books pioneering fields of psychology such as differential psychology, critical personalism, forensic psychology, and intelligence testing. Stern was also a pioneer in the field of child psychology. Together with his wife, Clara Joseephy Stern, the couple kept meticulous diaries detailing the lives of their 3 children for 18 years. He used these journals to write several books that offered an unprecedented look into the psychological development of growing children.

== Biography ==
=== Personal life ===
Ludwig Wilhelm Stern was born on April 29, 1871, in Berlin, Germany to Jewish parents, Rosa and Joseph Stern (1837–1890), their only child. He had originally been named Ludwig Wilhelm, but he later dropped his first name and was known simply as William. Stern's father owned a small design studio in Berlin, although the business was not very successful. When Joseph died in 1890, he left his family very little money, and William, who was studying at university, had to take up tutoring to support his sickly mother until her death in 1896.

Stern met his future wife, Clara Joseephy, while on a bicycle ride through Berlin. Joseephy's parents were unhappy with the match, as Stern had little money, but Clara persisted despite her parents’ disapproval and the two married early in 1899. They had their first daughter, Hilde, on April 7, 1900, which began the Stern's 18-year long project in child development. The couple also had a son, Günther, in 1902 and another daughter, Eva, in 1904.

Stern spent the final five years of his life in exile due to increased antisemitism in Germany. He spent one year in Holland before moving to the United States to accept a job as a professor at Duke University, despite knowing little English.

Stern was the uncle of the Jewish philosopher, literary critic and theorist, Walter Benjamin.

Stern died suddenly on March 27, 1938, of coronary occlusion.

=== Academic career ===
Stern studied philosophy and psychology at the University of Berlin under the guidance of Hermann Ebbinghaus where he later received his PhD in 1893. He followed Ebbinghaus to the University of Breslau where he taught from 1897 to 1916. From 1916 to 1933 he was appointed Professor of Psychology at University of Hamburg. After the rise of the Nazi Reich, Stern was forced to leave the university in 1934 and secured a position Duke University, where he was appointed Lecturer and Professor.

== Major contributions ==
=== Work in child development ===
Stern and his wife, Clara, greatly influenced the area of child development and they used their three children, Hilde, Gunther, and Eva, as subjects. They studied the development of language as well as other aspects of child development that they observed. His children were born in 1900, 1902, and 1904 respectively, and Stern and his wife started the journaling from the day each was born up until they were 12, 10, and 7, respectively. The data that they recorded included reactions, babbling, the ability to recall events, lying, moral judgement, and even systematic recording sessions where the child would elicit story narratives and descriptions with one parent while the other jotted down the notes. Through their observations, Stern found what is called "game theory", which is that child's play is necessary for the personal development of a child, as well as convergence theory, where nature and nurture are mutually dependent on each other regarding development. He applied convergence theory to the development of language in children, stating that a child does not just mimic what is said to them but instead chooses what words they comprehend. Stern also added that child babbling is less about the meaning of the babbling and more about the emotion that is behind it and that parents can communicate the child’s emotions back. This allowed for the children to learn that how they expressed something mattered.

=== Intelligence quotient ===
During Stern's time, many other psychologists were working on ways to qualitatively assess individual differences. Alfred Binet and Théodore Simon, for instance, were developing tests to assess the mental age of children in order to identify learning disabilities, but lacked a standardized way to compare these scores across populations of children. Stern had criticisms with the Binet-Simon intelligence test, saying that test application was too easy and the individuals giving the test were relying too heavily on the results. Stern suggested a change in the formula for intelligence, which has previously been calculated using the difference between an individual's mental age and chronological age. Instead, Stern proposed dividing an individual's mental age by their chronological age to obtain a single ratio. This formula was later improved by Lewis Terman, who multiplied the intelligence quotient by 100 to obtain a whole number.

Stern, however, cautioned against the use of this formula as the sole way to categorize intelligence. Stern thought of intelligence to be based on the general capacity of an individual, which he adjusted his thinking to a general adaptability to new problems and conditions of life. He differentiated intelligence and other mental capacities, but intelligence and memory do not function by oneself but intertwines with other intelligence functioning. He believed individual differences, such as intelligence, are very complex in nature and there is no easy way to qualitatively compare individuals to each other. Concepts such as feeble mindedness cannot be defined using a single intelligence test, as there are many factors that the test does not examine, such as volitional and emotional variables.

=== Tone variator ===
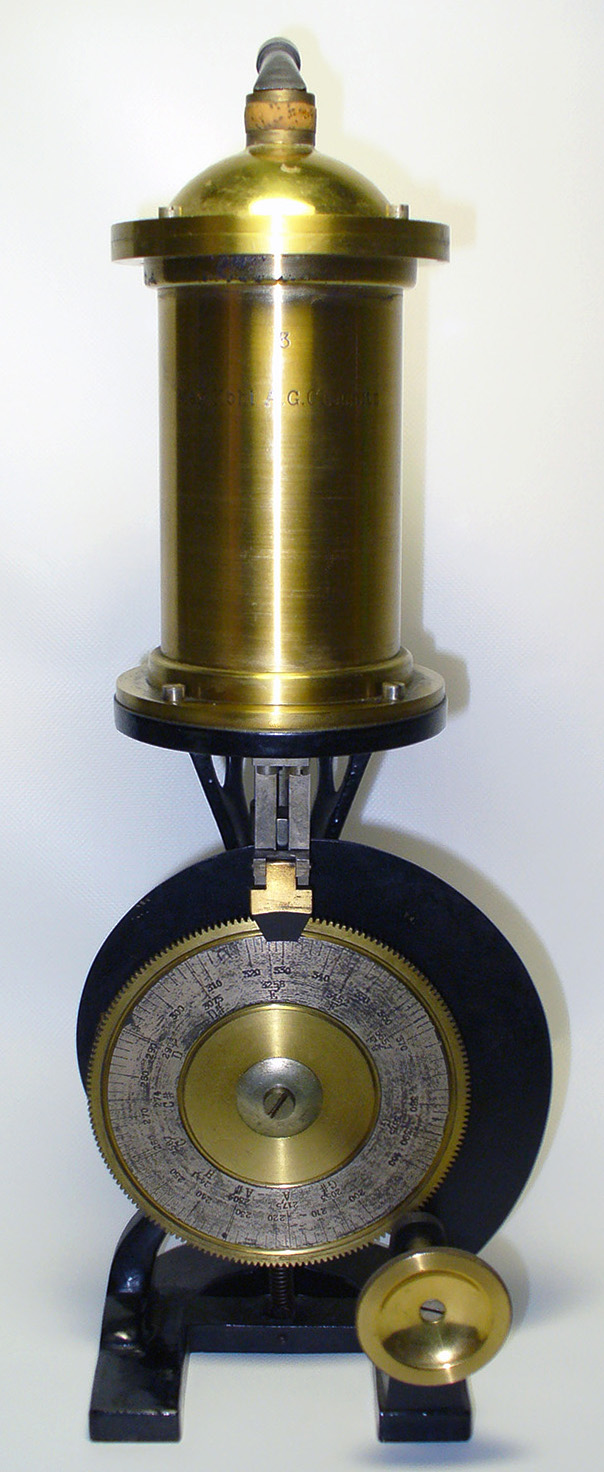
Tone variator by Max Kohl, Chemnitz, Germany

Stern invented the tone variator in 1897, which allowed him to study human sensitivity to changes in sound. Whereas his predecessors had limited themselves to studying thresholds and noticeable differences using constant, discrete stimuli, Stern studied the continuous change of one stimulus into the next.

=== Forensic psychology ===
Stern was a pioneer in the field that would become forensic psychology. Like Hugo Münsterberg, Stern explored the psychology of eyewitness testimony with particular attention to its accuracy. A student of memory research pioneer, Hermann Ebbinghaus, Stern had participants look at photographs and later asked them to recall details. He collaborated with criminologist Franz von Liszt; in 1901, they conducted a study where law students witnessed a staged classroom argument in which one protagonist drew a revolver at which point the professor stopped the mock fight. Students were then asked to give written and oral reports of the event. Stern and Franz found that, in such demonstrations, the subsequent recall was poor when tension was high, leading them to conclude that emotional states could affect eyewitness testimony. Other studies investigated the impact of questioning techniques, differences between children and adult witnesses, differences between male and female witnesses, and the way events occurring between the time of an event and the time of recall can affect the accuracy of testimony.

Stern noted that memory was fallible and sought ways to differentiate between intentional and unintentional falsification of testimony. These findings had the potential to improve the criminal justice system and illustrated practical applications of psychological research. Stern also noted the effects that the courtroom could have on children and advocated for the consultation of a professional psychologist whenever child testimony was used.

Stern also hypothesized that men were more reliable witnesses than women but subsequent work has challenged this suggestion. The study found there to be no significant sex differences among the participants concerning recall accuracy and resistance to false information. Stern's early work in forensic psychology has allowed for follow-up and scrutiny.

== Publications ==
- Stern, William (1914) [1912 (Leipzig: J. A. Barth, original German edition)]. Die psychologischen Methoden der Intelligenzprüfung: und deren Anwendung an Schulkindern [The Psychological Methods of Testing Intelligence]. Educational psychology monographs, no. 13. Guy Montrose Whipple (English translation). Baltimore: Warwick & York. ISBN 9781981604999. LCCN 14010447. OCLC 4521857.
- Stern, W. (1900). Über Psychologie der individuellen Differenzen: Ideen zu einer 'differentiellen Psychologie’ (On the psychology of individual differences: Toward a ‘differential psychology’). Leipzig: Barth.
- Stern, W. (1906). Person und Sache: System der philosophischen Weltanschauung. Erster Band: Ableitung und Grundlehre (Person and thing: System of a philosophical worldview (Rationale and basic tenets, Vol. one). Leipzig: Barth.
- Stern, C., & Stern, W. (1907). Die Kindersprache (Children's speech). Leipzig: Barth.
- Stern, C., & Stern, W. (1909). Erinnerung, Aussage und Lüge in der ersten Kindheit (Recollection, testimony, and lying in early childhood). Leipzig: Barth.
- Stern, W. (1911). Die Differentielle Psychologie in ihren methodischen Grundlagen (Methodological foundations of differential psychology). Leipzig: Barth.
- Stern, W. (1914). Psychologie der frühen Kindheit bis zum sechsten Lebensjahr (The psychology of early childhood up to the sixth year of age). Leipzig: Quelle & Meyer.
- Stern, W. (1916). Der Intelligenzquotient als Maß der kindlichen Intelligenz, insbesondere der Unternormalen (The intelligence quotient as measure of intelligence in children, with special reference to the subnormal). Zeitschrift für angewandte Psychologie.
- Stern, W. (1917). Die Psychologie und der Personalismus (Psychology and Personalism). Leipzig: Barth.
- Stern, W. (1918). Person und Sache: System der philosophischen Weltanschauung. Zweiter Band: Die menschliche Persönlichkeit (Person and thing: System of a philosophical worldview. Volume two: The human personality). Leipzig: Barth.
- Stern, W. (1924). Person und Sache: System der kritischen Personalismus. Dritter Band: Wertphilosophie (Person and thing: The system of critical personalism. Volume three: Philosophy of value). Leipzig: Barth.
- Stern, W. (1924). The psychology of early childhood up to the sixth year of age (trans: Barwell, A.). London: Allen & Unwin.
- Stern, W. (1927). Selbstdarstellung (Self-portrait). In R. Schmidt (Ed.), Philosophie der Gegenwart in Selbstdarstellung (Vol. 6, pp. 128–184). Barth: Leipzig.
- Stern, W. (1930). Eindrücke von der amerikanischen Psychologie: Bericht über eine Kongreßreise (Impressions of American psychology: Report on travel to a conference). Zeitschrift für Pädagogische Psychologie, experimentelle Pädagogik und jugendkundliche Forschung.
- Stern, W. (1938). General psychology from a personalistic standpoint (idem) (trans: Spoerl, H. D.). New York: Macmillan.
