= Barbara Pflaum =

Austrian photographer and photojournalist

Barbara Pflaum (10 January 1912 as Hansi Barbara Gebhardt – 24 March 2002) was an Austrian photographer and photojournalist.

She was married to the entrepreneur Peter Pflaum, her older sister to the Nobel Prize winner Konrad Lorenz.

== Career ==
Born in Vienna, Gebhardt attended fashion classes at the University of Applied Arts Vienna from 1931 to 1934. After her divorce, she continued her studies in the graphic arts class from 1948 to 1952 and in the early 1950s began to work increasingly in photography, initially as a commercial artist. Barbara Pflaum's estate is held by the Austrian photo agency IMAGNO brandstätter images. The executor of the estate is Gerald Piffl..

From 1955 until her retirement in 1977, Pflaum worked as a press photographer for the weekly newspaper Wochenpresse, where she supplied pictures for the sections "Domestic", "Reportage", "Culture", "Fashion" and "Chronicle". Pflaum is the author of several illustrated books, most of them with reference to Vienna.

Pflaum died in Vienna at the age of 90.

== Work ==
- With Jörg Mauthe: Wie ist Wien? E. Hunna, Vienna 1961.
- Die Wienerin, Residenz Verlag, Salzburg 1965
- With Ludwig Plakolb: Wien an der Wien. Jugend und Volk, Vienna/Munich 1971.
