= Joop Roeland =

- Born: Joannes Bernardus Roeland; 23 March 1931; Haarlem, Netherlands
- Died: 18 March 2010 (aged 78); Vienna, Austria
- Education: Priest; Writer
- Known for: Celebrating Mass at Christmas during the Occupation of the Hainburger Au

Joop Roeland OSA (1931–2010) was a priest. He was born in the Netherlands and relocated to Vienna at the end of the 1960s. Roeland briefly played an important part in the Occupation of the Hainburger Au, which was a turning point for environmental awareness, especially in German-speaking Central Europe.

== Life ==
=== Early years ===
Joop Roeland was the second of four children born in Haarlem to a bank official and his wife. Haarlem has a strong Roman Catholic tradition, and Roeland attended an Augustinian school. Here he took the decision to join the Augustinian Order himself.

He studied philosophy and theology at the universities of Eindhoven and Nijmegen. After his ordination he studied German language, literature and linguistics at Utrecht. He then taught German at a secondary school in Utrecht. He moved to Munich to progress his Germans studies, with the then high-profile Catholic intellectual, Romano Guardini before returning to the Netherlands to take up another school teaching post, this time in the Rotterdam conurbation at Schiedam.

Quotation

The church should rediscover how to smile. We need less scolding. The church should agonize less, and place more trust in people, and probably also in God's grace. Günter Grass says that the people have learned to whistle in the face of all life's worries. Christians should take up whistling again. The church should offer courses for whistling, training on letting go, just as Jesus recommends, an introduction to carefree forgetfulness whereby all life's uglinesses can be left behind, seminars where folks can relearn how to see, and the eyes and the heart can be at once liberated and opened up to that which is good and beautiful.

=== Migration ===
In 1967 Joop Roeland came to Vienna for a sabbatical year, intending to progress his doctoral dissertation. The dissertation was never finished, but by 1970 the relocation had become permanent when Cardinal König appointed Roeland Chaplain to the catholic High School Community.

=== Fame, briefly ===
He hit the headlines at the end of December 1984 when he celebrated Christmas Mass at the Hainberger Au flood plain. The Hainberger Au was at this time under occupation by a large number of environmentalist protesters and their sympathizers. The occupation, undertaken to block the building of a proposed hydro-power plant, had been under way for more than six months, but earlier in December it had acquired a hitherto unimaginable breadth of media coverage after a police operation which had left (officially) 19 injured: among the injured had been members of an Italian television news crew. The celebratory aspect of Joop Roeland's Christmas Mass at the Hainberger Au was enhanced by an official retreat in the face of the protests. A few days earlier the government had suspended attempts to prepare the ground for the building work as part of a (still temporary) "Christmas Peace", and protester numbers at the occupied wetlands were further swollen by people taking days off from work over Christmas.

=== Later career ===
Joop Roeland was employed as "Spiritual Assistant of the Forum and Cathedral Curate" at the Cathedral in Vienna. Additionally, in 1998, he was appointed chaplain for the homo-sexually inclined.

Between 1986 and 2006 he was also priest in charge of the "Ruprechtskirche", traditionally considered to be Vienna's oldest surviving church.

== Published works ==
- Kommunikationsversuche. 1972
- Nach dem Regen grünes Gras. Poetry, 1984, ISBN 3-222-11514-1
- Die Stimme eines dünnen Schweigens, 1992, ISBN 3-7867-8487-6
- An Orten gewesen sein. Prise and poetry, 1999, ISBN 3-7013-1007-6
- Wie die Worte das Fliegen lernten, 2006, ISBN 3-7013-1118-8
- Verlorene Wörter, 2009, ISBN 978-3-85351-208-1
