= Elisabeth Freundlich =

Austrian Jewish playwright, poet, & journalist (1906-2001)

Elisabeth Freundlich (July 21, 1906 – January 25, 2001) was an Austrian Jewish playwright, poet, and journalist who reported on the Frankfurt Auschwitz Trials. She was a Holocaust survivor.

== Life ==
Elisabeth Freundlich was born in Vienna, Austria, the daughter of the Jewish social democratic lawyer Jacques Freundlich. She majored in German and Theater. After completing her degree, she worked as a playwright at the Neues Wiener Schauspielhaus.

Her father was banned from the legal profession and arrested by the Nazis in 1934. He was placed under house arrest. The family fled Nazi Germany in 1938. First, they went to Zurich. Later, they arrived in Paris where she founded the Federation of Austrian Emigrants in May 1938. In September 1938, she co-founded the League for Spiritual Austria.

In 1940, she emigrated to New York to work as a university lecturer. She studied librarianship at Columbia University. In 1943, she earned a permanent position at the Metropolitan Museum of Art. She oversaw Austro-American exhibits. She married the philosopher Günther Anders who had also gone into exile. They returned to Vienna in 1950. She was unable to sell her manuscripts. She began translating American literature and writing for German newspapers including the Mannheimer Morgen. In the mid-1970s, she published an extensive poetic and journalistic work.

In 2009, the Elisabeth Freundlich Way in Vienna was named after her.

== Works ==
=== Fiction ===
- Der eherne Reiter (The Brazen Rider). Insel, Frankfurt 1982, ISBN 3-458-14029-8.
- Der Seelenvogel (The Soul Bird). Zsolnay, Vienna 1986, ISBN 3-552-03804-3.
- Finstere Zeiten (Dark Times). Persona, Mannheim 1986, ISBN 3-924652-05-8.
- Die fahrenden Jahre (The Traveling Years). Memories. Edited and epilogue by Susanne Alge. Otto Müller, Salzburg 1992, ISBN 3-7013-0824-1.

=== Non-fiction ===
- Sie wussten, was sie wollten: Lebensbilder bedeutender Frauen aus 3 Jahrhunderten (They knew what they wanted: portrayals of the lives of important women from 3 centuries). Herder, Freiburg 1981, ISBN 3-451-07893-7.
- Die Ermordung einer Stadt namens Stanislau. NS-Vernichtungspolitik in Polen 1939–1945. (The murder of a city called Stanislau. Nazi extermination policy in Poland 1939–1945). Österreichischer Bundesverlag, Vienna 1986, ISBN 3-215-06077-9. With afterwords by Susanne Alge and Yaroslav Hrytsak, re-edited by Paul Rosdy, Verlag der Theodor Kramer Gesellschaft, Vienna 2016, ISBN 978-3-901602-66-5.
