= Charlotte Lois Zelka =

American pianist (1930–2001)

Charlotte Lois Zelka (also Zelkowitz) (April 3, 1930 – October 6, 2001) was a concert pianist and founder of the Pasadena Music Ensemble.

== Life ==
She began playing the piano at age three. In her teens, she went to New York to study at the Juilliard School of Music and later with Artur Schnabel. When in her twenties she moved to Europe to tour the continent for two decades. She made several recordings for Vox during the 1950s. Included in her repertoire was Ernst Krenek's 5th piano sonata, which she commissioned. In 1957, she married philosopher and journalist Günther Anders. While she lived in Vienna, she performed with the music ensemblegroup die reihe with the composer and conductor Friedrich Cerha, teaching piano at a girls' school, and the Vienna Boy's Choir School. She translated her husband's works into English. She left Günther in 1972 to return to Monrovia, California, but they were never divorced and she kept in touch.
