= Günther Anders =

German-Austrian philosopher (1902–1992)

- Anders in 1929
- Born: Günther Siegmund Stern; 12 July 1902; Breslau, German Empire (now Wrocław, Poland)
- Died: 17 December 1992 (aged 90); Vienna, Austria
- Spouses: Hannah Arendt (m. 1929; div. 1937) Elisabeth Freundlich (m. 1945; div. 1955) Charlotte Lois Zelka (m. 1957)
- Parents: William Stern (father); Clara Joseephy (mother)

Education
- Education: University of Freiburg
- Doctoral advisor: Edmund Husserl
- Other advisor: Martin Heidegger

Philosophical work
- Era: 20th-century philosophy
- Region: Western philosophy
- School: Continental philosophy, phenomenology
- Main interests: Philosophy of technology
- Notable ideas: Philosophy of discrepancy

Günther Anders (German: [ˈɡʏntɐ ˈandɐs]; born Günther Siegmund Stern, 12 July 1902 – 17 December 1992) was a German-born (Note: Different sources use different versions – "Austrian philosopher", "German Jewish philosopher", "20th-century German Jewish philosopher Günther Anders", "a German philosopher and essayist of Jewish descent", "Le penseur allemand Günther Anders" (German thinker Günther Anders).) philosopher, journalist and critical theorist.

Trained as a philosopher in the phenomenological tradition, he obtained his doctorate under Edmund Husserl in 1923 and worked then as a journalist at the Berliner Börsen-Courier. At that time, he changed his name from Stern to Anders. He unsuccessfully tried to get a university tenure in the early 1930s and ultimately fled Nazism to the United States. Back in Europe in the 1950s, he published his major book, The Obsolescence of Man, in 1956.

An important part of Gunther Anders' work focuses on the self-destruction of mankind, through a meditation on the Holocaust and the nuclear threat. Anders developed a philosophical anthropology for the age of technology, dealing with such other themes as the effects of mass media on our emotional and ethical existence, the illogic of religion, and the question of being a thinker. He was awarded the Sigmund Freud Prize shortly before his death, in 1992.

== Biography ==
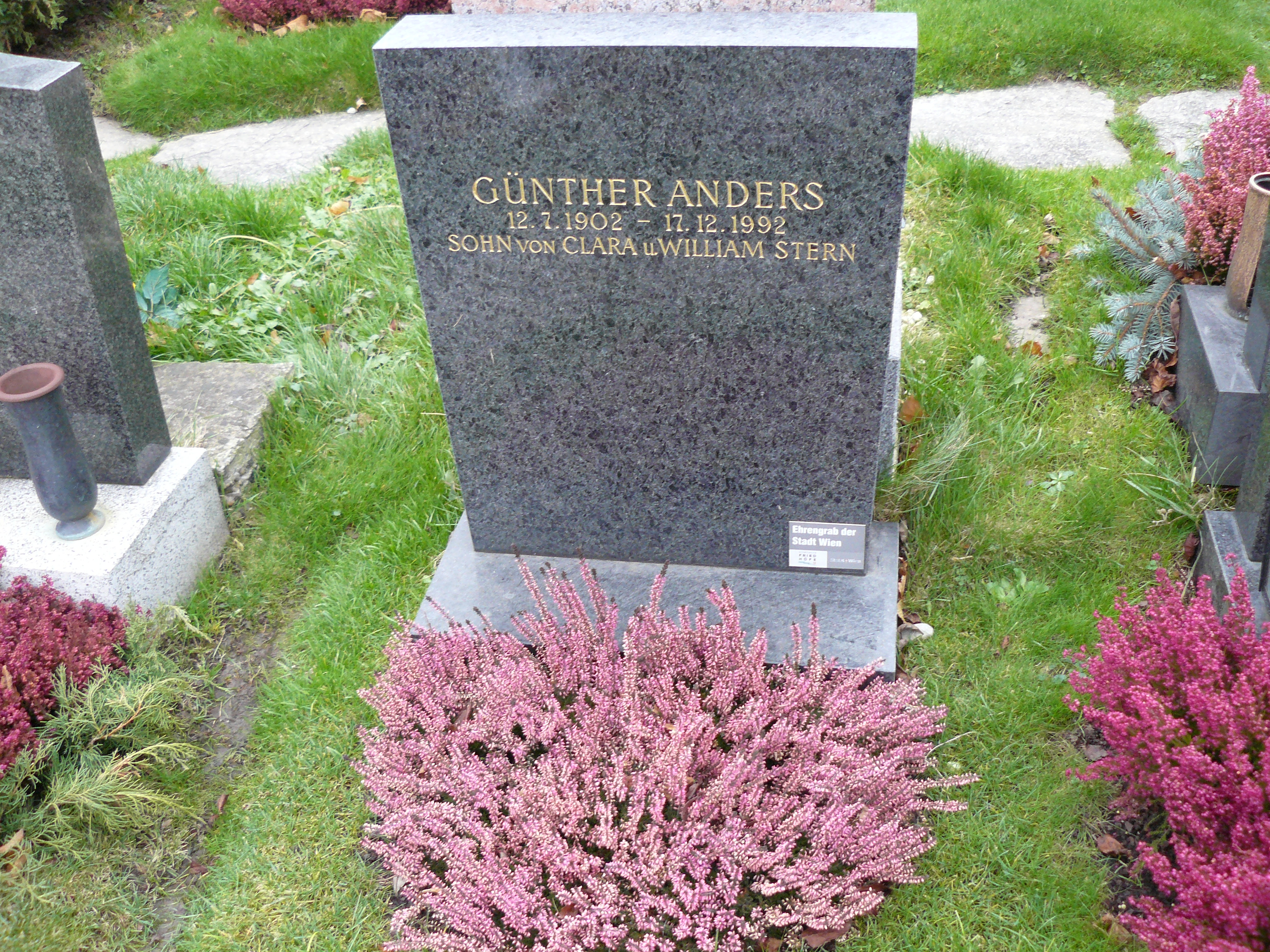
Günther Anders' grave in Vienna

=== Early life ===
Günther Anders (then Stern) was born on 12 July 1902, in Breslau (now Wrocław in Poland), the son of Jewish heritage founders of child developmental psychology Clara and William Stern and cousin to philosopher Walter Benjamin. His parents kept a diary of Gunther and his two sisters Hilde and Eva from April 1900, the birth of their first child Hilde, until August 1912. This record-keeping would span a combined 18 years in total. While the diaries were mainly an academic exercise in developmental child psychology, they were also a larger glimpse into the lives of the children growing up. The diaries were published in 1914.

Anders' sister Hilde was at one time married to the German philosopher Rudolf Schottlaender, who was also a student of Edmund Husserl, and later Hans Marchwitza. His other sister Eva would go on to be a part of Youth Aliyah and later worked for people with mental disabilities. However Anders' own parents, arguably his father, was the most significant intellectual influence in his life.

Anders was an atheist, and although he never officially became a member of the Frankfurt School, he did influence the thinking of some of its members.

In the late 1920s Anders studied with the philosopher Martin Heidegger at the University of Freiburg. In 1923, Anders obtained a PhD in philosophy; Edmund Husserl was his dissertation advisor. While Anders was working as a journalist in Berlin (Berliner Börsen-Courier) he changed his nom-de-plume to "Anders" (meaning other or different) which would go on to become his official name. There is more than one reason given in literature as to why he changed his name- one reason is that an editor did not want so many Jewish-sounding bylines in his paper, another reason for changing his surname was that his name would connect him to his popular parents.

He married, in 1929, a fellow student whom he'd met in Heidegger's seminar: Hannah Arendt. They married in Nowawes and at the time lived on Babelsberg's Merkurstraße 3 in Potsdam.

In 1930–31 he unsuccessfully attempted a habilitation under Paul Tillich in sociomusicology, and was advised by Max Wertheimer and Karl Mannheim to be patient. In 1931 he started writing a novel under the title Die Molussische Katakombe (The Molussian Catacomb), a novel about totalitarian techniques of brainwashing taking place within an underground prison. Anders worked on the novel from 1931 to 1933, and his friend Bertolt Brecht submitted it with his entrée or endorsement to the publishing Kipenhauer shortly before the Nazis took power. Anders fled the country shortly after Hitler was appointed chancellor on 30 January 1933, believing the false rumor that Brecht's diary, in which he was often mentioned, had been seized by the Gestapo. Anders was not the only one who feared being targeted by Hitler's agents: His cousin, Walter Benjamin also fled at right around that time and their mutual friend Ernst Schoen was arrested. (Anders, like Benjamin, frequently enjoyed playing chess with Brecht.) Hannah Arendt remained behind in Germany helping to smuggle refugees out of the Reich. She was arrested for eight days, having been reported by a librarian for the work that she was doing in scanning German newspapers for antisemitic propaganda and sending her findings to the World Zionist Congress on behalf of her friend Kurt Blumenfeld's localized (and now exiled) organization, the Zionist Federation of Germany.

=== Exile (1933–1950) ===
In 1933, Anders fled Nazi Germany, first to France (where he and Arendt divorced amicably in 1937), and in 1936 to the United States. In 1934 he gave a lecture on Kafka in Paris at the Institut d'Etudes Germaniques; he would go on to engage with Kafka in the coming years.

In the United States, he spent time in New York and California. He spent his time in a multitude of activities, hired in the United States Office of War Information, as a writer for Aufbau (journal), as a reviewer for a philosophical journal, as a tutor in the house of a famous composer and songwriter, as a worker in a factory, as a costume and theatrical property boy in Hollywood, as a tour guide at Metropolitan Museum of Art, as a failed scriptwriter, among others. He was a lecturer in The New School for Social Research.

Anders married a second time, in 1945, to the Austrian writer Elisabeth Freundlich, whom he had met in New York.

=== 1950s: return to Europe ===
Anders returned to Europe in 1950 with his wife to live in her native Vienna. While Germany had been the first choice, the political situation was not appropriate, and an academic post in Halle was no longer a choice. He often wrote for Merkur.

There, Anders wrote his main philosophical work, whose title translates as The Obsolescence of Humankind (1956). He became a leading figure in the anti-nuclear movement and published numerous essays and expanded versions of his diaries, including one of a trip to Breslau and Auschwitz with his wife. Anders' papers are held by the University of Vienna, and his literary executor is former FORVM editor Gerhard Oberschlick. He and his second wife divorced in 1955.

In 1957, Anders married a third time, to American pianist Charlotte Lois Zelka. Gunther knew how to play the piano and violin.

== Philosophy ==
Günther Anders has called his philosophy "occasional philosophy" (Gelegenheitsphilosophie) and "impressionistic philosophy". He never held an academic rank in Europe. A professorship from Free University of Berlin was declined. A lack of academic rank influenced his work, causing it to deviate from the usual academic style. Anders has also called himself a "critical theorist of technology". He also used Diskrepanzphilosophie (philosophy of discrepancy) in an attempt to classify himself. Anders is well known in Europe and has been published and researched to a considerable extent in the German language. Some of his work has been translated into other languages such as French and Spanish. As compared to his presence in Europe, his presence in the English language has been minimal. Günther wrote mostly in German.

Anders was an early critic of the role of technology in modern life and in this context was a trenchant critic of the role of television. His essay "The Phantom World of TV", written in the late 1950s, was published in an edition of Bernard Rosenberg and David Manning White's influential anthology Mass Culture. In it he details how the televisual experience substitutes images for experience, leading people to eschew first-hand experiences in the world and instead become "voyeurs". His dominant metaphor in this essay centers on how television interposes itself between family members "at the dinner table".

=== The Obsolescence of Humankind ===
His major work, of which only a few essays have been translated into English prior to 2026, is acknowledged to be (Note: Christopher John Müller writes "Anders' philosophical anthropology of the technological world, which he developed mainly in The Obsolescence of Human Beings Vol. 1 (1956) and Vol. 2 (1980)". Christian Fuchs writes that Die Antiquiertheit des Menschen is "principal work".) Die Antiquiertheit des Menschen (literally "The Antiquatedness of the Human Being"; while "obsolescence" was a typical translation early on, "antiquatedness" is considered more suitable). By the end of the 20th century, both volumes had sold about 140,000 copies. This wide readership dwarfed scholarly interactions. The essay argues that a gap has developed between humanity's technologically enhanced capacity to create and destroy, and our ability to imagine that destruction. Anders devoted a great deal of attention to the nuclear threat, making him an early critic of this technology as well. The two-volume work is made up of a string of philosophical essays that start with an observation often found in Anders' diary entries dating back to his exile in the US in the 1940s.

To provide an example from the first chapter of volume one: "First Encounter with Promethean Shame – Today's Prometheus asks: 'Who am I anyway?'"; "Shame about the 'embarrassingly' high quality of manufactured goods." What are we embarrassed about? Anders' answer to this question is simply "that we were born and not manufactured." Don Ihde suppressed an English translation of the two volumes.

=== Prometheanism ===
In 1942, Anders wrote of having found signs of a new form of shame which he provisionally called Promethean shame, that is "the shame when confronted by the humiliatingly high quality of fabricated things". He would later go on to express doubts about the existence of this kind of shame. Another iteration of the shame was "the incapacity of our imagination to grasp the enormity of what we can produce and set in motion". Promethean shame can be seen in posthumanism, in the comparisons we make with our creations. Anders utilizes the story of Prometheus and draws parallels to modern technology. For him, Prometheus means "he who thinks ahead".

The variations of the Promethean disjunction Anders referred to included the gap between the maximum that we can produce and imagine as compared to the maximum we use and need, which are in comparison "shamefully small". It is a disproportion between the capacities for destruction and construction where "we can construct much more than we are capable of destroying; that it is easy to build but very difficult to destroy". The Promethean gap refers to the incapacity to imagine the consequences of our creations.

=== Open Letter to Klaus Eichmann ===
Just as Arendt in her Eichmann in Jerusalem elucidated the Banality of Evil by pointing out that most heinous crimes can be committed by quite ordinary people, Anders explores the moral and ethical ramifications of the facts brought to light in the 1960–61 trial of Adolf Eichmann in We Sons of Eichmann: Open Letter to Klaus Eichmann (the son of the noted Nazi bureaucrat and genocidaire). He suggests that the appellation "Eichmann" properly designates any person who actively participated in, ignored or failed to learn about, or even knew about, but took no action against the Nazis' mass murder campaigns against Jews and others. He explained to his audience in Austria and Germany, among them young writers searching for ways to empathize with their parents' generation, that "there was but one viable alternative not only for Eichmann's son Klaus but all 'Eichmann sons', namely to repudiate their fathers since mourning them was not an option."

=== Mensch ohne Welt ===
In Mensch ohne Welt, Anders engages in a critique of the contemporary western commodity-society which he deems a society unfit for human beings. He views this perspective as negative-ontological. This world is a world for capital, not human beings, especially not for those who don't have the "great honor" to participate in labour. One is deemed adequate when one sells labour, the human being very far from being viewed as an end in herself, due to a kind of non laboro ergo non sum type of logic.

== Honors ==
- 1962: Premio Omegna della Resistenza Italiana (Omegna Award of the Italian Resistance)
- 1967: Deutscher Kritikerpreis (German critics prize)
- 1978: Großer Literaturpreis der Bayerischen Akademie der Schönen Künste (Grand Literature Prize of the Bavarian Academy of Fine Arts)
- 1983: Theodor W. Adorno Award
- 1979: Österreichischer Staatspreis für Kulturpublizistik (Austrian State Prize for Cultural Journalism)
- 1985: Andreas Gryphius Prize (rejected)
- 1992: Honorary doctorate from the University of Vienna (rejected)
- 1992: Sigmund Freud Prize

=== Günther Anders Prize for critical thinking ===
Günther Anders Prize for critical thinking (Preis für kritisches Denken) is a biannual award given by the International Günther Anders Society and sponsored by Verlag C. H. Beck. Constituted in 2018, winners include Joseph Vogl, Corine Pelluchon and Dietmar Dath.

== Works ==
=== Bibliographies ===
- Scheffelmeier, Von Heinz (January 1995). "Bibliographie Günther Anders (Stern) Primär-, Sekundär- und Tertiärquellen. 1924–1994". FORVM. Berlin. Archived from the original on 12 February 2006.
  - Scheffelmeier, Heinz (January 1995). "Bibliographie Günther Anders (Stern)". Reorganized and archived by Harold Marcuse. Berlin.

=== List of selected works ===
- Der Hungermarsch (The Hunger March). 1935
- Kafka Pro und Contra: Die Prozessunterlagen (Kafka, pro and contra. The Trial Records). 1951, 1985
- Die Antiquiertheit des Menschen (The Outdatedness of Human Beings).
  - vol I: Über die Seele im Zeitalter der zweiten industriellen Revolution (On the Soul in the Era of the Second Industrial Revolution). 1956 English translation by Christopher John Müller: The Obsolescence of the Human (Univ. of Minnesota Press, 2025)
  - vol. II: Über die Zerstörung des Lebens im Zeitalter der dritten industriellen Revolution. (On the Destruction of Life in the Era of the Third Industrial Revolution). 1980
- Der Mann auf der Brücke: Tagebuch aus Hiroshima und Nagasaki (The Man on the Bridge: Diary from Hiroshima and Nagasaki). 1959
  - Hiroshima ist überall. (Hiroshima is Everywhere). 1982
- George Grosz. 1961
- The Dead. Speech on three world wars. 1966
- Visit to Hades. Auschwitz and Breslau. 1966
- Die Schrift an der Wand (The Writing on the Wall). 1967
- Der Blick vom Turm. Fabeln (The View from the Tower. Fables) 1968, 1984, 2002
- Visit Beautiful Vietnam: ABC of Today's Aggression. 1968
- Nuernberg and Vietnam. Synoptical Mosaic. 1968
- Endzeit und Zeitenende (The Final Hours and the End of All Time. Thoughts on the Nuclear Situation). 1972
- My Jewishness. 1978
- The Atomic Threat. Radical Considerations [conferences]. 1958-1981
- Narratives. Gay Philosophy. 1983
- Mensch ohne Welt (Man Without World). 1984
- Lieben Gestern (Love Yesterday. Notes on the History of Feelings). 1986.
- The World as Phantom and Matrix. 1990
- On Philosophical Diction and the Problem of Popularization. 1992
- Homeless Sculpture, On Rodin. 1994
- View from the Moon. Reflections on Space Flights. 1994
- Heresies. 1996
- On Heidegger. 2001
- Philosophical Notes in Shorthand. 2002
- Daily Notes: Records 1941–1992. 2006

==== Correspondence and conversations ====
- Anders, Günther (2002). Wir Eichmannsöhne: Offener Brief an Klaus Eichmann [We Sons of Eichmann. Open Letter to Klaus Eichmann.] (in German). C.H. Beck. ISBN 978-3-406-47548-1.
- ——; Eatherly, Claude (1961). Off limits für das Gewissen: Der Briefwechsel zwischen dem Hiroshima-Piloten Claude Eatherly und Günther Anders [Burning Conscience: The Case of the Hiroshima Pilot Claude Eatherly, told in his Letters to Günther Anders] (in German). Rowohlt.
- ——; Schubert, Elke (1987). Günther Anders antwortet: Interviews & Erklärungen [Günther Anders answers. Interviews and Explanations] (in German). Klaus Bittermann. ISBN 978-3-923118-11-3.

==== Prose ====
- Anders, Gunther (1978). Kosmologische Humoreske und andere Erzählungen [Cosmological humoresque and other narratives] (in German). Frankfurt am Main: Suhrkamp. ISBN 978-3-518-06932-5. OCLC 4033457.
- —— (1992) [1938]. Die molussische Katakombe: Roman [The Molussian Catacomb] (in German). Beck. ISBN 978-3-406-36473-0.
- —— (1993). Mariechen: Eine Gutenachtgeschichte für Liebende, Philosophen und Angehörige anderer Berufsgruppen [Little Mary. Bedtime Stories for lovers, philosophers and members of other professional groups] (in German). C.H.Beck. ISBN 978-3-406-37403-6.
- Anders, Günther (Stern); Wolfe, Katharine (2009). "The Pathology of Freedom: An Essay on Non-Identification". Deleuze Studies. 3 (2): 278–310. doi:10.3366/E1750224109000658. ISSN 1750-2241. JSTOR 45331703.

==== Anthologies ====
- Anders, Günther (2006). Tagesnotizen: Aufzeichnungen 1941-1979 (1. Aufl. ed.). Frankfurt am Main: Suhrkamp. ISBN 978-3-518-22405-2.

== Secondary literature ==
=== Biography ===
- Bahr, Raimund (2010). Gunther Anders Leben und Denken im Wort (in German). Edition Art Science. ISBN 978-3-902157-71-3. OCLC 754200959.

=== In English ===
- Schraube, Ernst (2005b), "Anders, Günther. In (Ed.), (pp. 67–68). Farmington Hills: Macmillan.", in Mitcham, Carl (ed.), Encyclopedia of Science, Technology, and Ethics, Farmington Hills: Macmillan, pp. 67–68
  - ———— (2005). "'Torturing things until they confess': Günther Anders' critique of technology". Science as Culture. 14 (1): 77–85. doi:10.1080/09505430500041983. ISSN 0950-5431. S2CID 73638346.
  - ———— (2012). "Das Ich und der Andere in der psychologischen Technikforschung". Journal für Psychologie. 20 (1).
- Nosthoff, Anna-Verena; Maschewski, Felix (2019). "The obsolescence of politics: Rereading Günther Anders's critique of cybernetic governance and integral power in the digital age". Thesis Eleven. 153 (1): 75–93. doi:10.1177/0725513619863853. ISSN 0725-5136. S2CID 203054020.
  - Babich, Babette (2018). "On Günther Anders, political media theory, and nuclear violence". Philosophy & Social Criticism. 44 (10): 1110–1126. doi:10.1177/0191453718794741. ISSN 0191-4537. S2CID 150120200.
  - ———— (July 2012). "Geworfenheit und prometheische Scham im Zeitalter der transhumanen Kybernetik Technik und Machenschaft bei Martin Heidegger, Fritz Lang und Günther Anders". Die Neugier des Glücklichen (in German). Weimar: Bauhaus Universitätsverlag: 7–35.
  - ———— (2012–2013). "O, Superman! or Being Towards Transhumanism: Martin Heidegger, Günther Anders, and Media Aesthetics". Divinatio. 36: 83–99.
- Latini, Micaela (Fall 2015). Farinotti, Luisella; Grespi, Barbara; Maitre, Barbara Le (eds.). "The Vision of the End. Anders on the TV Series Holocaust". Cinéma & Cie. International Film Studies Journal. Vol. XV, no. 25 (Overlapping Images. Between Cinema and Photography ed.). Mimesis International. pp. 115–124.
- Müller, Christopher John (2021). "Hollywood, Exile, and New Types of Pictures: Günther Anders's 1941 California Diary "Washing the Corpses of History"". Modernism/Modernity Print Plus. 5 (4). doi:10.26597/mod.0185. S2CID 234021085.
- —————; Mellor, David (2019). "Utopia inverted: Günther Anders, technology and the social". Thesis Eleven. 153 (1): 3–8. doi:10.1177/0725513619865638. ISSN 0725-5136. S2CID 203107887.

Tricarico Giorgio makes extensive use of Anders’ perspectives, analyzing mass porn as a technological product in his work Lost Goddesses: a Kaleidoscope on Porn, Routledge (2018)

=== Other languages ===
German

- Dries, Christian (2012). Die Welt als Vernichtungslager: Eine kritische Theorie der Moderne im Anschluss an Günther Anders, Hannah Arendt und Hans Jonas (in German). Bielefeld: Verlag.
- —— (2009). Günther Anders. UTB Profile (in French and German). Stuttgart: UTB Gmbh. ISBN 9783825232573.
- Konrad Paul Liessmann, Günther Anders. Philosophieren im Zeitalter der technologischen Revolutionen. Munich, 2002.
- Margret Lohman, Philosophieren in der Endzeit. Zur Gegenwartsanalyse von Günther Anders. München, 1999.
- Bernd Neumann, "Noch Einmal: Hannah Arendt, Günther Stern/Anders mit bezug auf den jüngst komplettierten Briefwechsel zwischen Arendt und Stern und unter Rekurs auf Hannah Arendts unveröffentlichte Fabelerzählung Die weisen Tiere", in: Bernd Neumann, Helgard Mahrdt, and Martin Frank, eds., "The angel of history is looking back": Hannah Arendts Werk. Würzbach, 2001. pp. 107–126.
- Dirk Röpcke and Raimund Bahr, eds., Geheimagent der Masseneremiten – Günther Anders Wien, 2002.

Italian

- Franco Lolli, Günther Anders. Napoli-Salerno: Orthotes Editrice, 2014
- Micaela Latini, Aldo Meccariello, L'uomo e la (sua) fine. Studi su Günther Anders, eds., Asterios, Trieste 2014.
- Alessio Cernicchiaro, Günther Anders. La Cassandra della filosofia. Dall'uomo senza mondo al mondo senza uomo, Petite Plaisance, Pistoia 2014.
- Rosanna Gangemi, "Sovversioni del fotomontaggio politico: l'immagine agitata di John Heartfield", in Elephant&Castle. Laboratorio dell'immaginario, n. 26, dicembre 2021, https://elephantandcastle.unibg.it/web/saggi/sovversioni-del-fotomontaggio-politico-l-immagine-agitata-di-john-heartfield/403.
- Rosanna Gangemi, "L'arte è una disciplina da combattimento: George Grosz e Günther Anders", in Itinera 21/2021, Università degli Studi di Milano, https://riviste.unimi.it/index.php/itinera/issue/view/1705.
- Rosanna Gangemi, "Senza riparo in moto perpetuo. Günther Anders su Rodin", in La scrittura dell'esilio oltreoceano. Diaspora culturale italo-tedesca nell'Europa totalitaria del Nazifascismo. Riflessioni interdisciplinari, in E. Saletta (dir.), Roma, Aracne, 2020.
- Cozzi, Fabio (2011). Günther Anders Dall'uomo senza mondo al mondo senza uomo (Thesis). Pisa University Press.

French

- David, Christophe (2007). "Nous formons une équipe triste: Notes sur Günther Anders et Theodor W. Adorno". Tumultes. Günther Anders: Agir pour repousser la fin du monde (in French) (28/29): 169–183. doi:10.3917/tumu.28.0169. ISSN 1243-549X. JSTOR 24598663.
- Figuier, Richard; Mongin, Olivier (2003). "Pourquoi lire Günther Anders aujourd'hui? Le XX e siècle, Auschwitz, Hiroshima et la Kolyma". Esprit (1940–). 294 (5): 123–126. ISSN 0014-0759. JSTOR 24279861.
- Rosanna Gangemi, "Participation e(s)t pessimisme : George Grosz, témoin sans monde", in Image & Narrative 23/2, 2022.
- Rosanna Gangemi, "Le choc esthétique comme jugement moral et lutte politique : John Heartfield d'après Günther Anders", in C. Foucher Zarmanian, M. Nachtergael (dir.), Le phototexte engagé. Une culture visuelle du militantisme au XXe siècle, les presses du réél, Dijon, 2021.
- Rosanna Gangemi, "Günther Anders et Nicolas Rey – Le conte philosophique comme réactivation écranique de fragments sans lecteurs", in P. Clermont, D. Henky (dir.), Transmédialités du conte, Peter Lang, 2019.
- Rosanna Gangemi, Conférence Sculpture sans abri – L'inéluctabilité de l'air (Günther Anders 1902–1992), Musée Rodin, Paris, 9–10 novembre 2017. Podcast : http://www.musee-rodin.fr/fr/agenda/activite/rodin-londe-de-choc-ii.
- Edouard Jolly, Nihilisme et technique. Etude sur Günther Anders, EuroPhilosophie Editions, coll. "Bibliothèque de philosophie. sociale et politique". Lille, 2010.
- Thierry Simonelli, Günther Anders, De la désuétude de l'homme. Paris: Éditions September 2004.

Spanish

- Libertad en la era técnica: Günther Annders y la obsolescencia del ser humano, de Rayco Herrera, Independently Published, 2024, ISBN 979-8876054517
