= Konrad Paul Liessmann =

Austrian philosopher (born 1953)

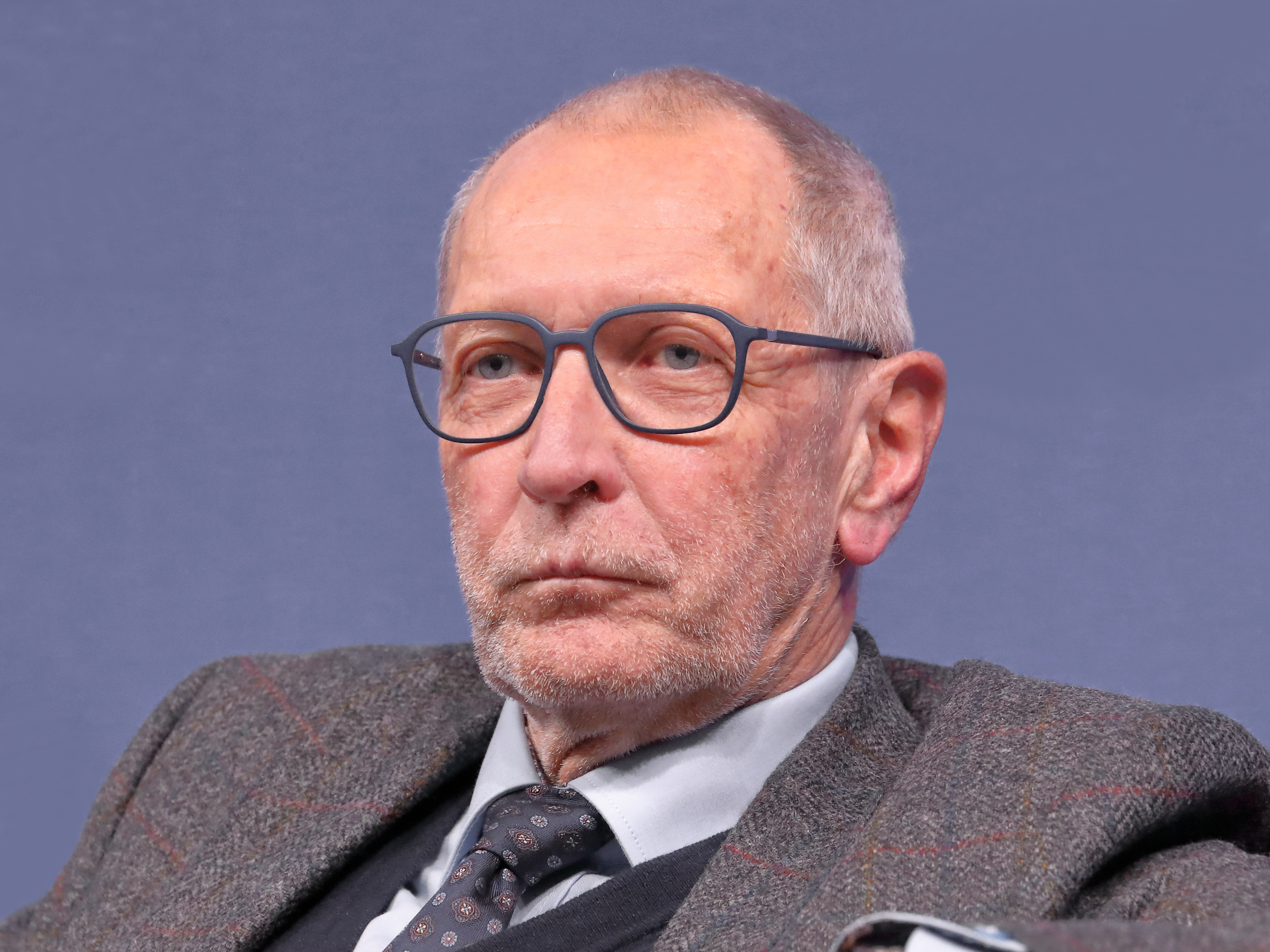
Konrad Paul Liessmann (2025)

Konrad Paul Liessmann (born 13 April 1953) is an Austrian philosopher, essayist and cultural publicist. He is a university professor for "Methods of Teaching Philosophy and Ethics" at the University of Vienna. He officially retired in 2018, but continued his professorial activities at the University of Vienna on a special contract basis until the end of 2020.

== Life ==
Born in Villach, Liessmann completed his Matura in 1971 at the Peraugymnasium in his hometown. and then studied German language and literature, history and philosophy at the University of Vienna and completed his Magisterium in 1976, receiving his doctorate in 1979 and his habilitation in 1989. In 2011, he was appointed to the professorship for methods of teaching philosophy and ethics at the Faculty of Philosophy and Educational Science at the University of Vienna. His love of literature came about through Karl May.

Since 1996 he has been the academic director of the Philosophicum Lech and editor of the book series of the same name published by Paul Zsolnay Verlag. From 2002 to 2006, he was head of the 'Friedrich Heer Working Group' of the Austrian Research Foundation and editor of Friedrich Heer's work at Böhlau Verlag.

From October 2004 to October 2008, Liessmann was Director of Studies for philosophy and educational science at the University of Vienna. From 2008 to 2012, Liessmann was vice dean of the Faculty of Philosophy and Educational Science. From 2011 to 2015, he was vice president of the "German Society for Aesthetics". From 2014 to 2018, he directed the university course "Philosophical Practice" at the University of Vienna. He retired in 2018. Liessmann has been vice-president of the "Society for Education and Knowledge" since 2010 and founding member and chairman of the "International Günther Anders Society" since 2012.

Liessmann has published numerous academic and essayistic works on questions of aesthetics, philosophy of art and culture, social and media theory, and 19th and 20th century philosophy. He had regular personal contact with Günther Anders in the last decade of his life.

Liessmann wrote an article on the occasion of Günther Anders's 80th birthday, in which he describes his first encounter with Anders. Liessmann also organised the first international symposium on Günther Anders in Vienna in 1991 and has been leading a research project to index his estate since 2012.

Since 2016, Liessmann has been a regular guest on the broadcast series Sternstunde Philosophie on Swiss television. On 28 July 2016, he gave the opening speech of the Salzburg Festival.

== Debate contributions ==
Liessmann repeatedly participates in public debates. He is a sought-after interview partner on Austrian Broadcasting and in the upmarket Austrian press. Controversial essays and commentaries in the feature pages of the daily newspapers Der Standard, Die Presse and the weekly magazine profil deal with current issues and discourses on socio-political topics. After writing a year-long column for the Neue Zürcher Zeitung from 2016 to 2020. He has been active as a columnist for the Wiener Zeitung since October 2020.

=== Car traffic ===
Liessmann is a sharp critic of environmental pollution, especially through car traffic. In The Good Man of Austria, a collection of essays from 1980 to 1995, Liessmann suggested in the essay 'The Auschwitz Principle' "that there is more than a lexical or phonetic connection between the gassing of the Nazis and the gassing of our civilisation. " Like the SS destroyed the Jews, "through our penchant for Volkswagens and motorways," Liessmann argues, "we destroyed the livelihoods of millions of people and thus destroyed them ourselves." Driving a car, locomotion with "a machine that has made man its slavish appendage" is "everyday fascism".

=== Belief in technology ===
As late as the 1980s, Liessmann wrote in 2001 in the Tagesspiegel, in view of various failures (such as the Challenger Explosion) and accidents (e.g. Bhopal or Chernobyl) based on supposed technical achievements, a general technosceptic mood prevailed. Now the "phobia" had given way to "euphoria" and it was true: "The problems of technology [...] are usually solvable by technology." This, Liessmann said, was surprising, "[t]o be sure, technology has not suddenly become harmless or without danger, but it has changed its shape. It has, as banal as it may sound, above all become smaller and thus more inconspicuous." Even the car illustrates this effect: while many people are afraid of air travels, the same people entrust themselves without hesitation to the demonstrably more dangerous road traffic. When driving a car, there is a kind of fusion of technical device and human being (who often controls the former himself), and the same can be seen with mobile phoness, which are "almost perceived as a part of the body". Liessmann concluded that technologies increasingly determine our behaviour, creating an "illusion of freedom" but de facto signifying subjugation.

=== Education ===
Liessmann published his critique of the current education system through the capitalisation of the mind primarily in Theory of Uneducation, The Fallacies of the Knowledge Society and in the polemic Geisterstunde. The Practice of Uneducation. In Geisterstunde Liessmann argues against the Pisa Study and also attacks the education experts Bernd Schilcher, Andreas Salcher, Richard David Precht and Gerald Hüther; their reform proposals would reinforce the errors of the existing education system. Their importance lies less in the quality of their expertise than in the media attention they enjoy. Furthermore, he criticises the "competence orientation" of teaching pushed by the Minister of Education Claudia Schmied instead of the orientation towards pure content and sees a transformation of higher schools into socio-educational institutions. In modern pedagogy and the new campus culture with its microaggressions and trigger warnings, factual knowledge no longer counts for much, but the feelings and sensitivities of those concerned count for everything.

=== Populism ===
According to Liessmann, populists can be found across the political spectrum. He refuses to attribute the accusation of simplifying complex issues to populists alone; rather, all parties would engage in this. Political messages would generally represent simplifications. The modern type of protest voter does not choose a political preference, but expresses his discomfort with established politics, by which he no longer feels taken seriously. With regard to the US presidential candidate Donald Trump or the Freedom Party of Austria candidate Norbert Hofer for President of Austria, Liessmann said that one could not gather completely different phenomena under the inflationarily used term "right-wing populism". The term would then be an embarrassment that would describe everything that does not fit for various reasons and would then no longer have any analytical power. Barbarians, according to Liessmann, are not to be found on the right-wing fringe, but rather at the "control centres of art and science", in quality media and universities.

=== Language policy ===
On the subject of gender-neutral language, Liessmann joined others in calling for a "return to linguistic normality". Currently, a "minimal percentage of militant language feminists impose their will on the almost 90 percent majority". Liessmann demands to do without "nonsense of gendering", from Binnen-I to slashes and underscores. He says that indented I and Co lead to a tortured and unreadable language without a sense of style. Gendering reaches questionable proportions in the academic milieu.

Liessmann is a critic of Leichte Sprache, which is characterised by a catalogue of prohibitions. Leichte Sprache, he argues, is a pure art product and an attempt at radical reduction, flattening and simplification. "Light language is shallow language." Liessmann is also critical of anglicism.

== Audio ==
- Gibt es kontaminierte Kunst? Verbannen ist das Gegenteil eines Dialogs, Konrad Paul Liessmann in conversation with Anja Reinhardt, Deutschlandfunk 7 July 2019, Audio-Version

== Publications ==
=== Books ===
- Ästhetik der Verführung. Kierkegaards Konstruktion der Erotik aus dem Geiste der Kunst (Anton Hain. Vol. 21). Hain, Frankfurt 1991, ISBN 3-445-06021-5; Erweiterte Neuausgabe: Sonderzahl, Vienna 2005, ISBN 978-3-85449-241-2.
- Ohne Mitleid. Zum Begriff der Distanz als ästhetische Kategorie mit ständiger Rücksicht auf Theodor W. Adorno. Passagen, Vienna 1991.
- Karl Marx *1818 +1989. Man stirbt nur zweimal. Sonderzahl, Vienna 1992 (2nd edition 1993).
- Kierkegaard – Zur Einführung. Junius, Hamburg 1993 (2nd edition 1999; 3rd edition 2003; 4th edition 2010; Chinese translation 2010).
- Der Aufgang des Abendlandes. Eine Rekonstruktion Europas. Sonderzahl, Vienna 1994.
- Der gute Mensch von Österreich. Essays 1980–1995. Sonderzahl, Vienna 1995 (2nd edition 1996).
- Philosophie der modernen Kunst. WUV-Universitätsverlag, Vienna 1993 (2nd extended edition 1994, 3rd edition 1998, UTB-edition 1999, 2nd edition of the UTB edition 2000, Czech translation 2000; Spanish translation 2006; Russian translation 2010).
- Vom Nutzen und Nachteil des Denkens für das Leben (Vorlesungen zur Einführung in die Philosophie, vol. 1.) WUV-Universitätsverlag, Vienna 1997, ISBN 3-85114-345-0 (2nd edition 1998, Dutch translation 1999).
- Die großen Philosophen und ihre Probleme. Vorlesungen zur Einführung in die Philosophie 2. WUV-Universitätsverlag, Vienna 1998 (2. Auflage 1999, Dutch translation 2000, UTB edition 2001, 2nd and 3rd edition of the UTB edition 2003).
- Philosophie des verbotenen Wissens. Friedrich Nietzsche und die schwarzen Seiten des Denkens. Zsolnay, Vienna 2000 (2nd edition 2000, 3rd edition 2002).
- Günther Anders. Philosophie im Zeitalter der technologischen Revolutionen. C. H. Beck, Munich 2002. ISBN 978-3-406-48720-0
- Kitsch! oder warum der schlechte Geschmack der eigentlich gute ist. Brandstätter, Vienna 2002.
- Reiz und Rührung. Über ästhetische Empfindungen. WUV-Universitätsverlag, Vienna 2003; UTB Ausgabe 2008
- Spähtrupp im Niemandsland. Kulturphilosophische Diagnosen. Zsolnay, Vienna 2004, ISBN 978-3-552-05303-8.
- Die Insel der Seligen. Österreichische Erinnerungen. Studienverlag, Innsbruck 2005.
- Der Wille zum Schein. Über Wahrheit und Lüge. Zsolnay, Vienna 2005, ISBN 978-3-552-05339-7.
- Theorie der Unbildung. Die Irrtümer der Wissensgesellschaft. Zsolnay, Vienna 2006, ISBN 978-3-552-05382-3 (2nd to 6th edition. 2006, 7th to 15th edition. 2007, 17th edition 2008; Paperback edition (Piper) 2008; Czech and Croatian translations 2008, Macedonian translation 2012).
- Zukunft kommt! Über säkularisierte Heilserwartungen und ihre Enttäuschung. Bibliothek der Unruhe und des Bewahrens im Styria-Verlag, Graz 2007.
- Schönheit. UTB facultas.wuv Vienna 2009.
- Hodnota Clovéka. Filosoficko-politicke Eseje. Nadace Dagmar a Václava Havlovich VIZE 97. Praha 2010.
- Das Universum der Dinge. Zur Ästhetik des Alltäglichen. Zsolnay, Vienna 2010. (Czech and Slovenian translation 2012, Bulgarian translation 2014).
- Bildung ist ein Lebensprojekt. Martin Kolozs im Gespräch mit Konrad Paul Liessmann. Studienverlag, Innsbruck 2011.
- Lob der Grenze. Kritik der politischen Unterscheidungskraft. Zsolnay, Vienna 2012, ISBN 978-3-552-05583-4.
- Ein optimistischer Blick auf den Pessimismus. Wieser, Klagenfurt 2013 (with Bazon Brock).
- Philosophie der modernen Kunst. Extended new edition, Vienna: facultas.wuv 2013.
- Grenzen (in) der Kunst. (with Thomas Daniel Schlee) Wieser, Klagenfurt 2014, ISBN 978-3-99029-122-1.
- Geisterstunde. Die Praxis der Unbildung. Eine Streitschrift. Zsolnay, Vienna 2014, ISBN 978-3-552-05700-5.
- Totgesagte leben länger. Karl Marx und der Kapitalismus im 21. Jahrhundert. Hanser, Munich 2015 (hanserbox E-Book).
- Vom Kopf zur Hand, ... und dazwischen eine ganze Welt. Wieser, Klagenfurt 2015 (together with Wolfgang Ullrich, Peter Strasser and Eduard Kaeser).
- (with Michael Köhlmeier) Wer hat dir gesagt, dass du nackt bist, Adam? Mythologisch-philosophische Verführungen, Hanser, Munich 2016, ISBN 978-3-446-25288-2.
- Bildung als Provokation, Zsolnay, Vienna 2017, ISBN 978-3-552-05824-8
- (with Nicolas Mahler) Die kleine Unbildung. Liessmann für Analphabeten. Zsolnay, Vienna 2018, ISBN 978-3-552-05912-2.
- (with Michael Köhlmeier) Der werfe den ersten Stein: mythologisch-philosophische Verdammungen Hanser, Munich 2019, ISBN 978-3-446-26402-1.
- Alle Lust will Ewigkeit: Mitternächtliche Versuchungen, Paul-Zsolnay-Verlag, Vienna 2021, ISBN 978-3-552-07207-7.

=== Radio series ===
- Thinking and Living. Approaches to philosophy in biographical sketches. 5-part ORF CD edition, Vienna 1999.
- Thinking and Living II. Approaches to philosophy in biographical sketches. 4-part ORF-CD-Edition, Vienna 2000
- Thinking and Living III. approaches to 20th century philosophy in biographical sketches. 5-part ORF-CD-Edition, Vienna 2001
- Thinking and Living IV. Approaches to Philosophy in Biographical Sketches. Rebels and Eccentrics. 4-part ORF-CD-Edition, Vienna 2007
- Narrating and Thinking. Michael Köhlmeier and Konrad Paul Liessmann in dialogue about state, beauty and money. 3-part ORF CD edition, Vienna 2011

=== Editorships ===
- Das Millennium. Essays zu tausend Jahren Österreich. Vienna: Sonderzahl, 1996 (with Gernot Heiß)
- Faszination des Bösen. Über die Abgründe des Menschlichen. Vienna, Munich: Zsolnay, 1998 (Philosophicum Lech 1)
- Im Rausch der Sinne. Kunst zwischen Animation und Askese. Vienna, Munich: Zsolnay, 1999 (Philosophicum Lech 2)
- Perspektive Europa. Modelle für das 21. Jahrhundert. Vienna: Sonderzahl, 1999 (with Gerhard Weinberger)
- Die Furie des Verschwindens. Über das Schicksal des Alten im Zeitalter des Neuen. Vienna: Zsolnay, 2000 (Philosophicum Lech 3)
- Der Vater aller Dinge. Nachdenken über den Krieg. Vienna: Zsolnay, 2001 (Philosophicum Lech 4)
- Der listige Gott. Über die Zukunft des Eros. Vienna: Zsolnay, 2002 (Philosophicum Lech 5)
- Die Kanäle der Macht. Freiheit und Herrschaft im Medienzeitalter. Vienna: Zsolnay, 2003 (Philosophicum Lech 6)
- Ruhm, Tod und Unsterblichkeit. Über den Umgang mit der Endlichkeit. Vienna: Zsolnay 2004 (Philosophicum Lech 7)
- Die Dichter und das Denken. Wechselspiele zwischen Literatur und Philosophie. Vienna: Zsolnay 2004 (with Klaus Kastberger)
- Der Wille zum Schein. Über Wahrheit und Lüge. Vienna: Zsolnay 2005 (Philosophicum Lech 8)
- Der Wert des Menschen. An den Grenzen des Humanen. Vienna: Zsolnay 2006 (Philosophicum Lech 9)
- Die Freiheit des Denkens. Vienna: Zsolnay 2007 (Philosophicum Lech 10)
- Die Gretchenfrage. "Nun sag', wie hast du's mit der Religion". Vienna: Zsolnay 2008 (Philosophicum Lech 11)
- Geld. Was die Welt im Innersten zusammenhält? Vienna: Zsolnay 2009 (Philosophicum Lech 12)
- Kritik & Utopie. Positionen & Perspektiven. Edited with Hubert Chr. Ehalt and Wilhelm Hopf. Münster: Lit 2009
- Grundbegriffe der europäischen Geistesgeschichte. Wahrheit, Gerechtigkeit, Freiheit, Eros, Schönheit, Glück, Arbeit, Macht, Krieg, Tod. 10 volumes. Vienna: Facultas WUV UTB 2009
- Vom Zauber des Schönen. Reiz, Begehren und Zerstörung. Vienna: Zsolnay 2010 (Philosophicum Lech 13)
- Der Staat. Wieviel Herrschaft braucht der Mensch. Vienna: Zsolnay 2011 (Philosophicum Lech 14)
- Die Jagd nach dem Glück. Bedingungen und Grenzen guten Lebens. Vienna: Zsolnay 2012 (Philosophicum Lech 15)
- Tiere. Der Mensch und seine Natur. Vienna: Zsolnay 2013 (Philosophicum Lech 16)
- Sackgassen der Bildungsreform. Ökonomisches Kalkül – Politische Zwecke – Pädagogischer Sinn. Vienna: facultas.wuv 2013 (with Katharina Lacina)
- Ich. Der Einzelne in seinen Netzen. Vienna: Zsolnay 2014 (Philosophicum Lech 17)
- Es gibt Kunstwerke – Wie sind sie möglich? Munich: Fink 2014. (with Violetta L. Waibel)
- Schuld und Sühne. Nach dem Ende der Verantwortung. Vienna: Zsolnay 2015 (Philosophicum Lech 18)
- Neue Menschen! Bilden, optimieren, perfektionieren. Vienna: Zsolnay 2016 (Philosophicum Lech 19)
- Über Gott und die Welt. Philosophieren in unruhiger Zeit. Vienna: Zsolnay 2017 (Philosophicum Lech 20)
- Mut zur Faulheit. Die Arbeit und ihr Schicksal. Vienna: Zsolnay 2018 (Philosophicum Lech 21)
- Widerstand ist keine Kunst – je wohlfeiler gesellschaftlicher Protest geworden ist, desto wichtigtuerischer kommt er daher. 13 September 2025, NZZ

== Awards ==
- 1991: Förderungspreis der Stadt Wien
- 1996: Austrian Staatspreis für Kulturpublizistik
- 1998: Kulturpreis der Stadt Villach
- 2003: Ehrenpreis des österreichischen Buchhandels für Toleranz in Denken und Handeln
- 2006: Austrian Wissenschaftler des Jahres 2006
- 2010: Donauland Sachbuchpreis Danubius 2009
- 2010: The VIZE 97 Prize of the Havel Foundation Prague
- 2014: Preis der Stadt Wien für Geisteswissenschaften
- 2015: Deutscher Schulbuchpreis
- 2016: Paul Watzlawick Ehrenring of the Vienna Medical Chamber
- 2025: Wilhelm Hartel-Preis of the Austrian Academy of Sciences

For his 60th birthday in 2013, a Festschrift was written which refers to Liessmann's professional activities. It contains contributions by Robert Pfaller, Martin Seel, Klaus Albrecht Schröder, Lambert Wiesing, Volker Gerhardt, Andreas Gruschka, Franz Schuh and Barbara Schneider-Taylor among others.
