= Occupation of the Hainburger Au =

Conservationist movement for an Austrian wetland

Coordinates: 48.1458°N 16.8933°E

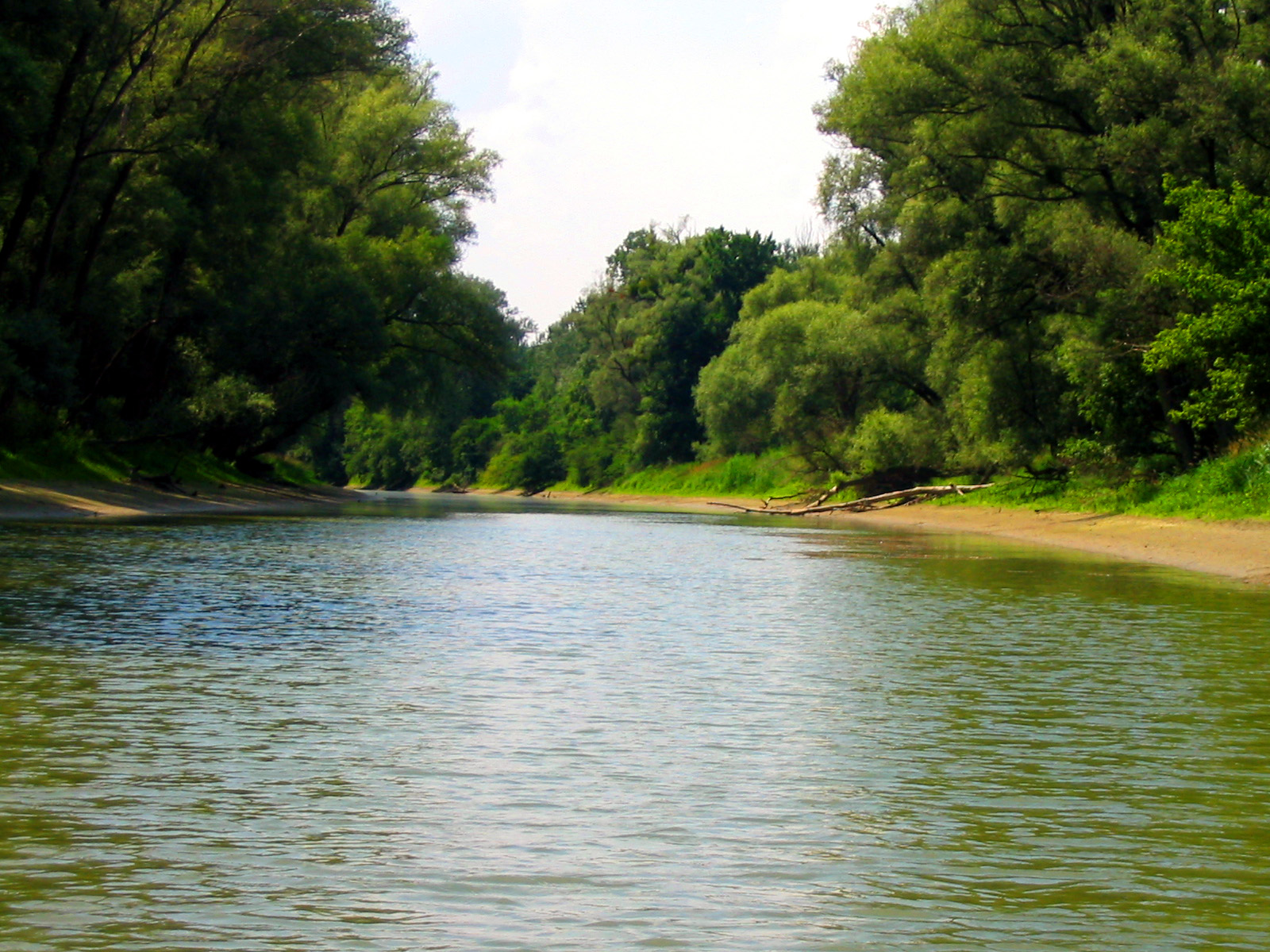
The Hainburger Au

The Occupation of the Hainburger Au wetlands in December 1984 marked a turning point for environmental awareness in German speaking central Europe and was of great significance for the development of democratic processes in Austria.

The Hainburger Au is a large naturally occurring flood plain bordering the River Danube at, and upstream of, Hainburg in Lower Austria. It is a short distance to the east of Vienna's main airport. Since 1996, it has been part of the Danube-Auen National Park.

In February 1983, the Austrian branch of the World Wide Fund for Nature (WWF) began a campaign under the slogan "Rettet die Auen" to preserve the Hainburger Au flood plain. With the help of various media channels the WWF began to publicise the threat of impending destruction for a large part of the region. The threat came from plans, which at the end of 1984 still enjoyed the full support of the Austrian government, to construct a hydro-electric power plant. As events unfolded, the nature of the protesters' demonstrations and a mass-occupation of the threatened area changed peoples' understanding of democracy as well as national energy policy in Austria.

== History ==
=== Background ===
In 1983, the regional power generation company announced to the Water Authority that the construction of Hainburg Hydro-power plant had been designated as a "preferred" hydro-project. Under the Austrian Water Laws then in force, the "preferred" designation of the planned hydro-electric project gave it a special status "in the general [public] interest" which would concentrate granting of the necessary regulatory approvals with a single authority, and correspondingly limit the number of stages in the process and the opportunities for appeal against decisions. After the authorisation process had been completed, construction work began at Stopfenreuth (Engelhartstetten) in December 1984.

=== The campaign ===
The WWF's campaign enjoyed the support of numerous environmental activists, but initially there was only limited interest in the matter from the wider public. Two people, the journalist Günther Nenning and Gerhard Heilingbrunner, a leading officer of the Students' Union ("Österreichische Hochschülerinnen- und Hochschülerschaft")/(ÖH), now emerged as instigators of a campaign for a referendum on the conservation of the Hainburger Au wetlands, and their protection through the creation of a "National Park". High-profile support came from the 1973 Nobel Prize winner Konrad Lorenz, whose name came to be attached to the campaign for the "Konrad-Lorenz-Volksbegehrens" ("Konrad Lorenz Referendum").

On 7 May 1984, the campaigners held a press conference at Vienna's Concordia Press Club: the event later came to be known as the "Animals' Press conference" ("Pressekonferenz der Tiere"). Those present included various people from public life, such as the journalist Günther Nenning (dressed as a stag) and the city council member Jörg Mauthe (dressed as a black stork). The left wing playwright Peter Turrini turned up as a toad while the then chairman of the youth wing of Austria's opposition ÖVP (Austrian People's Party), Othmar Karas, came as a cormorant. The event gained extensive media coverage and won for the power station's opponents a much increased level of public awareness.

=== Occupation, confrontation and escalation ===
On 8 December 1984, the ÖH organised a mass demonstration which attracted about 8,000 participants. Several hundred remained behind at the Au, forcing a suspension of the site-clearance work.

The Hainburger Au was declared a "forbidden zone" and a controversial police intervention followed on 19 December 1984. Batons were used to clear an area of approximately 4 hectares (approx 10 acres), which were fenced off and placed under police surveillance. The action involved a confrontation between 800 police personnel and approximately 3,000 environmentalist occupiers. Officially 19 people were injured, including members of an Italian television crew. That same evening some 40,000 people demonstrated on the streets of Vienna to protest against the government's actions and against the building of the power station.

=== Stand off ===
Two days later, on 21 December 1984, the national government formally imposed a suspension of the site clearance, and on 22 December 1984 Federal Chancellor Sinowatz, under pressure from public opinion and several influential media organisations (notably the mass-market Kronen Zeitung), announced a "Christmas Peace". Thousands of people spent their Christmas holidays at the Au. The priest Dr. Joop Roeland (1931–2010) celebrated Christmas Mass with the environmentalist occupiers. At the beginning of January 1985 the High Court placed a prohibition on further site-clearing work pending a conclusion of the dispute, and the occupation ended.

=== Victory to the protesters ===
The number of signatures needed under the constitution for a "referendum" had only recently been doubled from 100,000 to 200,000. The "Konrad Lorenz Referendum", on the proposal for the Hainburger Au to be protected as a designated National Park, took place in March 1985 and attracted 353,906 signatures.

On 1 July 1986, the Austrian "Supreme Court" finally annulled the earlier decision to allow the construction of the Hainburger Au hydro-electric power plant.

Shortly afterwards the Trade Minister Norbert Steger pushed through two laws which between them more or less satisfied the demands of the "Konrad Lorenz Referendum".

== Implications for Austrian democracy ==
The Hainburger Au affair marked the first time that the role of successful civil disobedience was officially acknowledged as a valid component of direct democracy in Austria. In other respects, Hainburg was actually the second occasion on which a grass-roots democratic movement had used the device of a referendum to block the commissioning of a controversial power plant, the previous one having occurred in 1978 when the Zwentendorf Nuclear plant, having been built, never came on stream.

For the Austrian Green Party ("Grüne Alternative") the affair led directly to the reconstitution of various smaller parties and pressure groups into a political party which in 1986 won 4.8% of the national vote, giving it seats in the Austrian parliament for the first time.

Subsequently, almost every major infrastructure project in Austria has been accompanied by its own Civilian Initiative movement. In 1996 the construction of a hydro-power plant at Lambach was delayed by a protesters' occupation (which actually lasted longer than the one at the Hainburger Au). 2003 saw a "symbolic" occupation to prevent the construction of tunnels under the Lobau (also part of the Danube-Auen National Park) which would be necessary for the completion of the outer ring road round the eastern side of the Vienna conurbation.

== Policy consequences for energy and environment ==
The events at the Hainburger Au raised the profile of environmental concerns, and they highlighted like nothing else the contrast between traditional "Conservative" and "Green" approaches, not only in Austria but also in neighbouring Germany where the way was now paved for the inclusion of a Green Party in a government coalition. From now on environmental awareness was an important element in all the party programmes, right across the political spectrum. Even on the Austrian right, economic liberals stepped back from unqualified opposition to the Social Partnership model, and started talking about the Eco-social market economy ("Öko-soziale Marktwirtschaft").

It had become clear that for Austrians protecting the land was as important as energy security. National radio reported a "new environmental consciousness" ("neuen Umweltbewußtsein der Österreicher").

For decades a succession of hydro-electric projects in the Kaprun Valley (Hohe Tauern) had promoted power station construction as a flagship of national economic regeneration, but the 1980s brought two decisive changes to this benign backdrop for power generation. On the one hand, the decision to halt development of the Zwentendorf Nuclear Power Plant signaled a retreat from nuclear power generation which the 1986 Chernobyl catastrophe seemed to endorse. But with the Hainburger Au occupation it became apparent that hydro-power could not be a complete alternative because of conflicts involving tourism and recreational interests.

The route towards a sustainable energy policy was already being set out in the mid 1980s. Austria itself is relatively poor in terms of conventional energy resources, and has only limited space available for extensive alternative energy sources. Nevertheless, the oil crises of 1973 and 1979 had already focused Austria on a longer-term strategy towards energy self-sufficiency. As of 2014, Austrian energy policy is increasingly focused on a pan-European "energy network" approach, gas storage and the more efficient balancing of base-load energy purchased cheaply abroad with energy demand peaks, achieved by converting existing hydro-power stations into energy storage facilities.

Environment policy and the protection of nature more generally, since the 1979 designation of Stausee as a reserve and the incorporation in 1981 of the Kaprun and nearby hydro-power plants into the High Tauern National Park, have become better integrated, and increasingly dealt with in the context such as wilderness conservation and a wider biosphere awareness.

== Reading list (German language) ==
- Gundi Dick, u. a. (Hrsg.): Hainburg. Ein Basisbuch. 276.485 Anschläge gegen den Stau. Verlag für Gesellschaftskritik, Wien 1985.
- Ingrid Monjencs, Herbert Rainer (Hrsg.): Hainburg – 5 Jahre danach. Kontrapunkt – Verlag für Wissenswertes, Wien 1989.
