= The Outdatedness of Human Beings =

1956 and 1980 volumes by Günther Anders

The Outdatedness of Human Beings (German: Die Antiquiertheit des Menschen; where Antiquiertheit can be translated as outdatedness, antiquatedness or obsolescence) is a two-volume work by philosopher and journalist Günther Anders. The first volume was published by C.H. Beck in Munich in 1956, the second one in 1980. The unfinished third one was split up into six parts and published over the span of 1989–90.

== Reviews ==
- Daniel Morat, "Timeliness of Guenther Anders' Obsoleteness, Anthropology in the Industrial Age." Institute of Contemporary History, Georg-August Universitaet Goettingen.
- "Guenther Anders' media critique and attention disorder". Frankfurter Allgemeine Zeitung.
- Radio program "Buch-Tipps". Guenther Anders. Schweizer Rundfunk und Fernsehen.
- Roland Merk, writer. Guenther Anders.
- Christian Dries, philosopher University of Freiburg. "From The Outdatedness of Human Beings to and Ethics of Contingency, Guenther Anders as a Thinker of the Present." Symposium. Waldhof Akademie für Weiterbildung.
- Frank Hartmann, lecture University of Vienna. "Outdatedness of Human Beings. Philosophy of Technology and Media Critique"

== English translations ==
- The Obsolescence of Man, Volume I. Translated by Josep Monter Pérez
- The Obsolescence of Man, Volume II. Translated by Josep Monter Pérez
- The Obsolescence of the Human. Translated by Christopher John Müller, edited by Christopher John Müller and Christian Dries. Minnesota University Press, 2025

== See also ==
- Visit Beautiful Vietnam
