= Weiten =

- Municipality
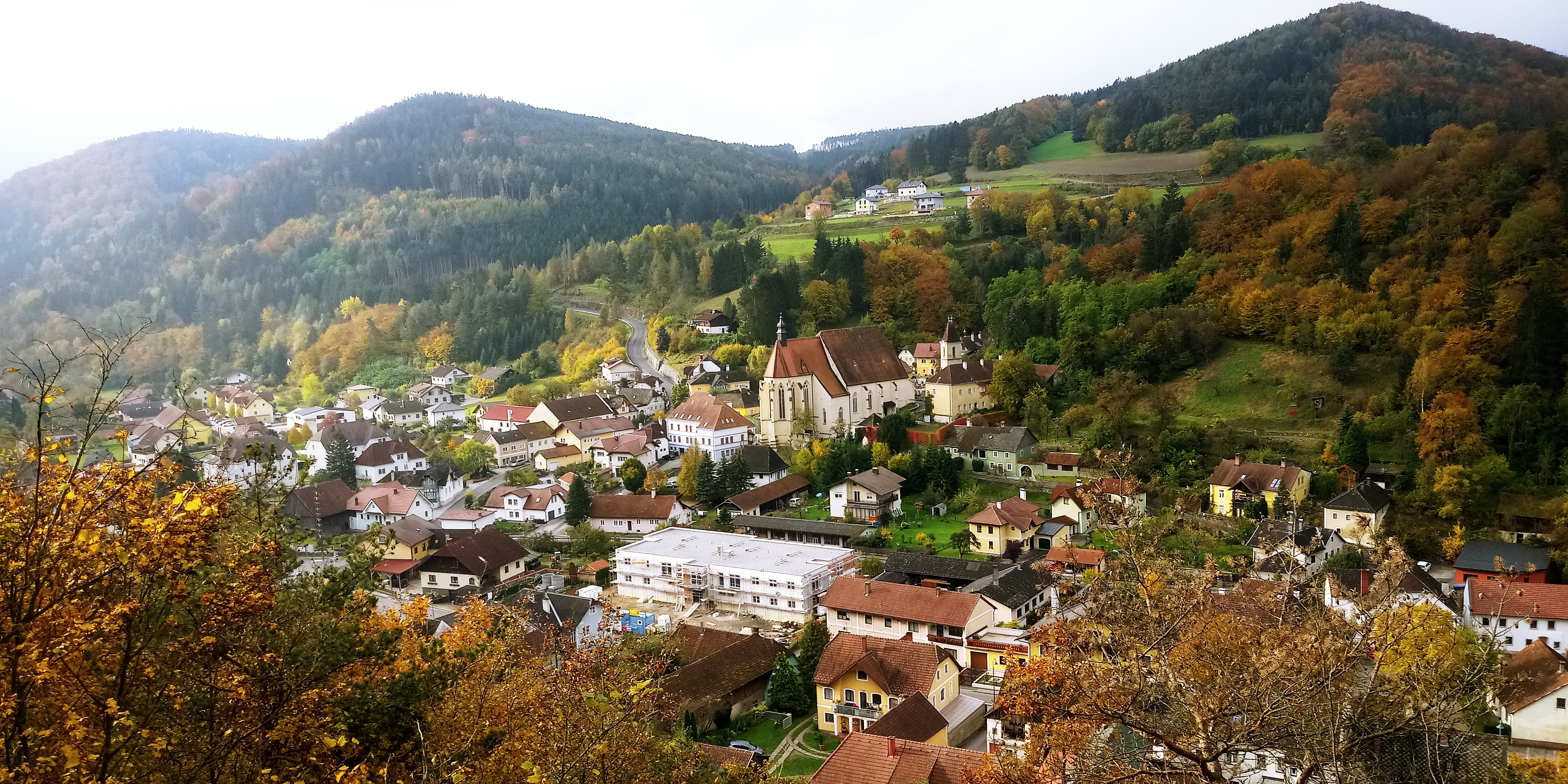
- View of Weiten

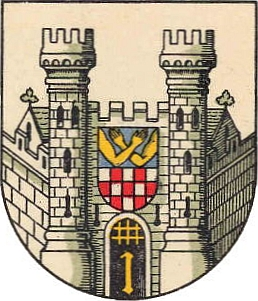
- Coat of arms

- Location within Austria
- Coordinates: 48°18′N 15°16′E
- Country: Austria
- State: Lower Austria
- District: Melk

Government
  - Mayor: Franz Höfinger

Area
  - Total: 28.53 km^{2} (11.02 sq mi)
- Elevation: 349 m (1,145 ft)

Population (2018-01-01)
  - Total: 1,094
  - Density: 38.35/km^{2} (99.31/sq mi)
- Time zone: UTC+1 (CET)
  - Summer (DST): UTC+2 (CEST)
- Postal code: 3653
- Area code: 02758
- Website: www.weiten.gv.at

Weiten is a town in the district of Melk in the Austrian state of Lower Austria.

== Population ==
Historical population
Year	Pop.	±%
1971	1,185	—
1981	1,180	−0.4%
1991	1,125	−4.7%
2001	1,153	+2.5%
