= Josef Dvorak =

Austrian therapist, theologian and author (1934–2026)

Josef Dvorak (28 January 1934 – January 2026) was an Austrian therapist, Catholic theologian (scholar of Karl Rahner) and author who was the co-founder of the Viennese Actionism.

== Life and work ==
Dvorak was born in Vienna on 28 January 1934. For several years, Dvorak worked as a journalist for the Viennese newspapers Kurier and Arbeiter-Zeitung. At least from the beginning of the 1960s, Dvorak worked in Vienna as a therapist. In this time he also got to know Otto Muehl, who conducted a conversation analysis on Dvorak. At the end of the 1960s, Dvorak was an important intellectual source of inspiration for the left-winged Viennese student scene.

End of the 1970s, Dvorak claimed to have had an encounter with Satan while under the influence of LSD. After that, Dvorak retreated into a farmhouse in the Lower Austrian Waldviertel and began celebrating "Satanic masses with plenty of naked flesh and blood" ("Satanische Messen mit viel nacktem Fleisch und Blut“)

In the 1980s, Dvorak celebrated a modification of English occultist Aleister Crowley’s Missa Phoenix in Burgenland and in Bremen. These happenings have been broadcast on Austrian television and gained Dvorak the reputation of being close to Satanism himself.

Dvorak called himself a "Satanologist" and, as a free researcher and publicist, was particularly engaged in the history of psychoanalysis and the occult. In 1989 he wrote a book "Satanismus. Schwarze Rituale, Teufelswahn und Exorzismus, Geschichte und Gegenwart." ("Satanism. Black rituals, devil obsession and exorcism, past and present").

Dvorak died in January 2026, at the age of 91.

== Literature ==
- Josef Dvorak: Satanismus. Schwarze Rituale, Teufelswahn und Exorzismus, Geschichte und Gegenwart. Heyne, Munich, 1989. ISBN 3-453-17258-2
