= Günther Nenning =

Austrian journalist, author, and political activist

Günther Nenning (December 23, 1921 – May 14, 2006) was an Austrian journalist, author, and political activist.

Günther Nenning was born in Vienna, Austria. After an excellent performance in high school, Nenning served from 1940 to 1945 in the German Wehrmacht. At the end of World War II he was arrested by US forces, but soon released on condition that he stay in the Western sector. He studied linguistics and religious studies in Graz, being promoted Dr. phil. and Dr. rer. pol. in 1949 and 1959 respectively.

He died in Waidring, Tyrol aged 84.

== Journalism ==
During his studies he started his journalistic career, first as a writer, later as vice chief editor of the socialist daily newspaper Neue Zeit. In 1958 he switched as co-owner to the cultural journal FORVM in Vienna, in 1965 he followed Friedrich Torberg as owner and chief editor, changing the name to NEUES FORVM. Nenning left the journal in 1970, handing it over as community property to a club of writers and employees. He founded a youth journal in 1973, but due to legal and financial problems had to stop it in 1975. Since the early 1970s he wrote as a columnist for major Austrian newspapers.

Joining the socialist faction of the Austrian Trade Union Federation (ÖGB), in 1960 he became chairman of the Austrian Journalists' Union. Accused of intending to form his own media union, in 1985 he was expelled from the Austrian Trade Union Federation, causing hundreds of journalists to leave the ÖGB in protest. In 1990 he was fully rehabilitated, and received honors for 50 years of membership in 2000.

== Politics ==
Nenning's political views were "multicolored", and not confined to a single party. He termed himself "Rot–grün–hellschwarzer" (red–green–light-black, referring to socialism, greens and conservatism). He participated in the protests for an Austrian media reform in 1964, in the early 1970s against the war in Vietnam, and in 1978 against the planned nuclear power plant in Zwentendorf.

In 1984 he was one of the leading protesters against the Danube power plant at Hainburg, which earned him the nickname "Auhirsch" (meadow deer). He was one of the most influential mentors in the early years of the then forming Austrian Green Party. His green activities and ecologically motivated rants against socialist members of parliament caused the Austrian socialist party to expel him in 1985. A month later Nenning joined the Swiss socialist party.

Nenning had always been an ardent activist for women's rights, and called himself a convinced feminist.

== Books and TV ==
Günther Nenning was a prolific author, who also directed TV movies and a documentary for the ORF (Austrian television). Among others, he was TV host of the talk show Club 2 (ORF) and host of the German TV talk show III nach 9 (ARD). In addition to his many authored books, Nenning spent the final year of his life editing a 21-volume anthology of Austrian literature after 1945, first called "Austrokoffer" (Austro-suitcase; it was designed to fit in a large, brightly decorated carrying case) and then received the less controversial title of "Landvermessung" (Land-measuring or Land-surveying). It became a cause celebre when critics felt that Nenning was unqualified to edit such a collection and some major authors like Elfriede Jelinek refused to contribute work due to government funding of the project. 139 authors eventually found representation in the well-designed collection, which had to be issued in a second limited edition due to public demand.

== See also ==
- List of Austrian writers
