= Stainless Steel Executive of the Year =

Stainless steel industry award

Stainless & Special Steel Executive of the Year
- The trophy and the award logo
- Awarded for: Outstanding achievements in the stainless and special steel industry
- Country: International
- Presented by: Steel & Metals Market Research (SMR)
- First award: 2007
- Website: smr-events.com

The Stainless & Special Steel Executive of the Year (also known as the Stainless Steel Executive of the Year or STS Executive of the Year) is an international annual industry award presented by Steel & Metals Market Research (SMR) to recognize senior executives for their outstanding achievements and contributions to the global stainless steel and special steel industry.

The award has been presented since 2007 during SMR's annual International Stainless & Special Steel Conference in Europe.

== History ==
The award was established in 2007. Its first recipient was Spanish steel industry executive Victoriano Muñoz, who received the distinction at the 6th International Stainless & Special Steel Summit in Helsinki, Finland, in September 2007.

The award has been presented at annual international conferences organized by SMR. The events were initially known as the International Stainless & Special Steel Summit and subsequently adopted the name International Stainless & Special Steel Conference.

The award recognizes individual contributions to the stainless and special steel industry rather than achievements by companies as corporate entities.

The award has been presented three times to executives associated with the Spanish international industrial Acerinox Group: Victoriano Muñoz (2007), Bernardo Velázquez (2021), and Cristóbal Fuentes (2025).

== Selection process ==
According to information published by the award recipients' organizations, the selection involves an election committee comprising senior representatives of the stainless and special steel industry. Previous award recipients have also participated in the committee.

The award is presented at a ceremony held during the annual SMR conference.

== Recipients ==
The following is a list of recipients published by SMR.

Year	Recipient	Conference	Location
2007	Victoriano Muñoz	6th International Stainless & Special Steel Summit	Helsinki, Finland
2008	Kazuo Hoshino	7th International Stainless & Special Steel Summit	Marbella, Spain
2009	Claus Raidl	8th International Stainless & Special Steel Summit	Düsseldorf, Germany
2010	Antonio Marcegaglia	9th International Stainless & Special Steel Summit	Rome, Italy
2011	Benedikt Niemeyer	10th International Stainless & Special Steel Summit	Munich, Germany
2012	I. S. Lin	11th International Stainless & Special Steel Summit	Stockholm, Sweden
2013	Günter Pilarsky	12th International Stainless & Special Steel Summit	London, United Kingdom
2014	Robert Chen	13th International Stainless & Special Steel Summit	Istanbul, Turkey
2015	Giancarlo Stringhini	14th International Stainless & Special Steel Summit	Vienna, Austria
2016	Mikael Sthaalros	15th International Stainless & Special Steel Summit	Lisbon, Portugal
2017	Timoteo Di Maulo	16th International Stainless & Special Steel Summit	Ljubljana, Slovenia
2018	Dennis Oates	17th International Stainless & Special Steel Summit	Helsinki, Finland
2019	Hartwig Härtel	18th International Stainless & Special Steel Summit	Seville, Spain
2021	Bernardo Velázquez	International Stainless & Special Steel Conference	Como, Italy
2022	Giuseppe Marzorati	International Stainless & Special Steel Conference	Hamburg, Germany
2023	Robert Yüksel Yıldırım	International Stainless & Special Steel Conference	Zurich, Switzerland
2024	Ratan Jindal	International Stainless & Special Steel Conference	Rome, Italy
2025	Cristobal Fuentes	International Stainless & Special Steel Conference	Istanbul, Türkiye
2026	Yuri Atanasov	International Stainless & Special Steel Conference	Offenbach, Germany

== Notable recipients ==
=== Victoriano Muñoz ===
Victoriano Muñoz Cava (born 1936) was the first recipient of the award in 2007. He was a prominent Spanish engineer and executive in the steel industry.

=== Claus Raidl ===
Claus Raidl (1942–2024) was an Austrian steel industry executive and banker. He chaired Böhler-Uddeholm (1991–2007), served on voestalpine's board (2007–2010), and headed the Austrian National Bank's General Council (2008–2018). He received the award in 2009.

=== Antonio Marcegaglia ===
Antonio Marcegaglia (born 1963) is an Italian business executive who is the Chairman and CEO of steel manufacturer Marcegaglia. He has been awarded Stainless Steel Executive of the Year 2010.

=== Bernardo Velázquez ===
Bernardo Velázquez (born 1964), chief executive officer of the Spanish steel company Acerinox, received the award in 2021.

=== Giuseppe Marzorati ===
Giuseppe Marzorati, then president of the Italian steel manufacturer Cogne Acciai Speciali, received the award in 2022.

=== Ratan Jindal ===
Ratan Jindal is an Indian business executive and chairman and managing director of Jindal Stainless, one of India's leading stainless steel manufacturers. He received the award in 2024.

=== Yuri Atanasov ===
Yuri Atanasov (born 1964), chief executive officer of Ukrainian seamless stainless steel pipes and tube manufacturer Centravis, received the award in 2026.
