= Vienna University of Economics and Business =

Public university in Vienna, Austria

Coordinates: 48°12′51″N 16°24′29″E

- Type: Public
- Established: 1898
- Affiliations: AMBA, EQUIS, CEMS, EFMD, EUA, AACSB, Partnership in International Management, triple accreditation
- Rector: Rupert Sausgruber
- Administrative staff: 2,740 (2025-04)
- Students: approx. 22,000 (2025-04)
- Location: Vienna, Austria
- Campus: Urban
- Website: www.wu.ac.at/en

The Vienna University of Economics and Business (German: Wirtschaftsuniversität Wien, lit. 'University of Economy Vienna' [ˈvɪrt.ʃaftsunivɛrsiˌtɛːt ˈviːn], WU) is a public research university in Vienna, Austria. The university holds triple accreditation (AACSB, EQUIS and AMBA).

== History ==
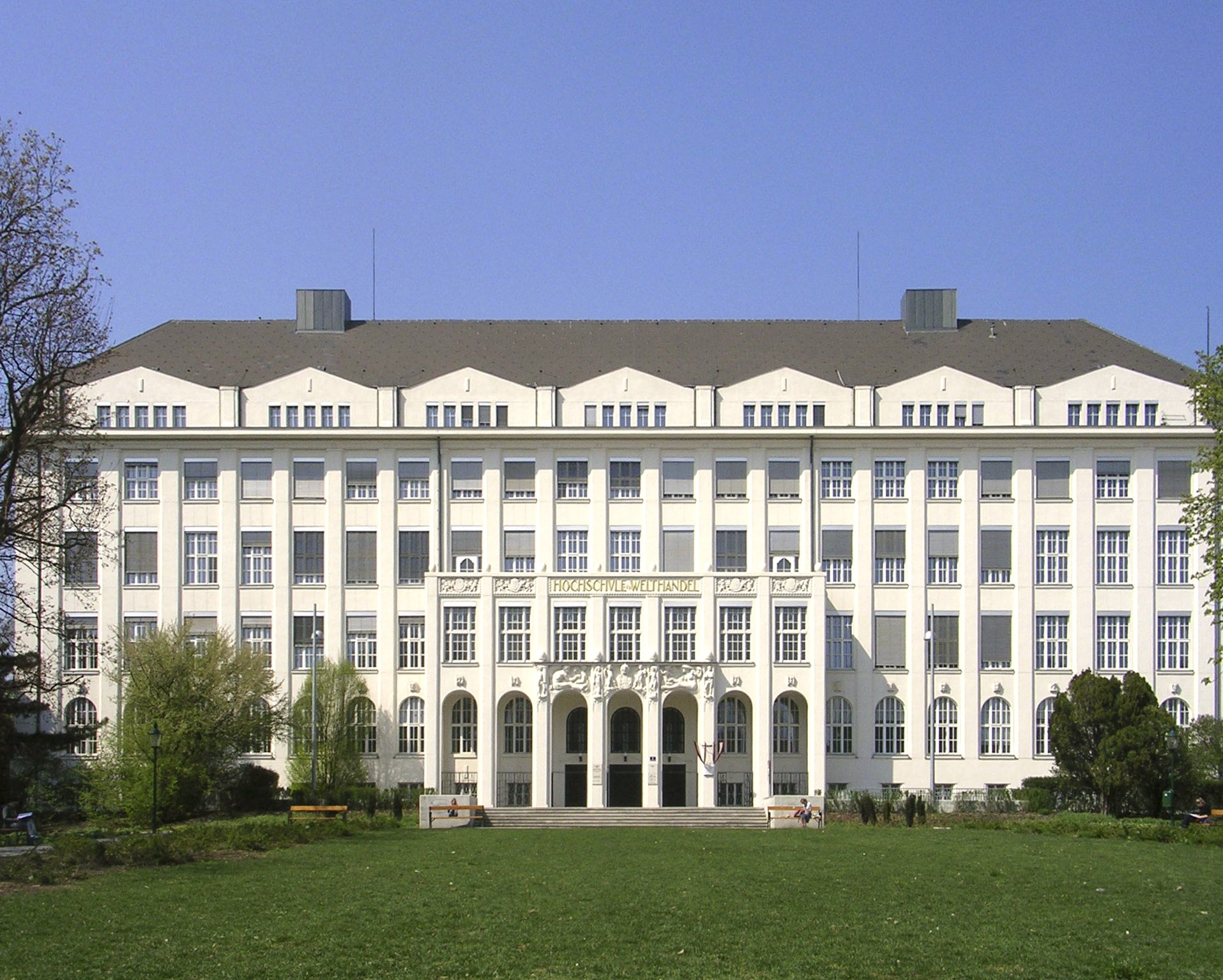
Old building of the Hochschule für Welthandel, Währinger Park (used by the University of Vienna since 1985)

WU was founded on 1 October 1898 as k.u.k. Exportakademie (in English: Export Academy) to provide professional training to future businesspeople and thus stimulate the Austro-Hungarian empire’s economy. In 1919, after the end of World War I, this educational institution was granted the status of a Hochschule, an educational institution equivalent to a university but specializing in a certain field, such as technology or business or art. At that time, it was renamed to Hochschule für Welthandel. The course of studies leading to the academic degree of Diplomkaufmann provided training preparing for the export and banking businesses and was very practical, comprising courses in business administration, economics, law and other subjects. In 1930, the Hochschule für Welthandel was granted the right to issue doctoral degrees.

After Austria’s annexation by Nazi Germany in 1938 (the so-called Anschluss), Jewish students, faculty, and staff members at the University of World Trade were rapidly expelled, along with supporters of the former Austrofascist regime, while positions were filled by academics loyal to Nazism. During World War II, further exclusions targeted nationals of “enemy states” and individuals classified under racist laws, with some members murdered in the Holocaust and others stripped of academic degrees for political and racial reasons. The university also aligned its curriculum with Nazi policies and benefited institutionally from the regime’s imperial ambitions, including through organizations promoting economic expansion in Southeast Europe.

After World War II, the Hochschule für Welthandel increased its breadth in research. It started to become an important institution in Austrian society at that time; many Austrian managers and many politicians received their university education there. From 1966 onward, it began to offer a more theoretically oriented course of studies in economics. In 1975, it was renamed to Wirtschaftsuniversität Wien. At the same time, the number of students began to increase significantly. In 1982, it moved to a campus in Vienna’s 9th District. Due to further increasing student numbers during the 1990s, the campus eventually became too small. As a result, new university grounds had to be built in Vienna’s 2nd district. The new Campus WU opened in October 2013, next to the Vienna Fair Ground.

In 2015, Edeltraud Hanappi-Egger was elected rector of WU. She was the first woman in the history of the university to be elected rector. Her term began on 1 October 2015. Inaugurated in 2023, the current rector of the university is Rupert Sausgruber.

== New campus ==
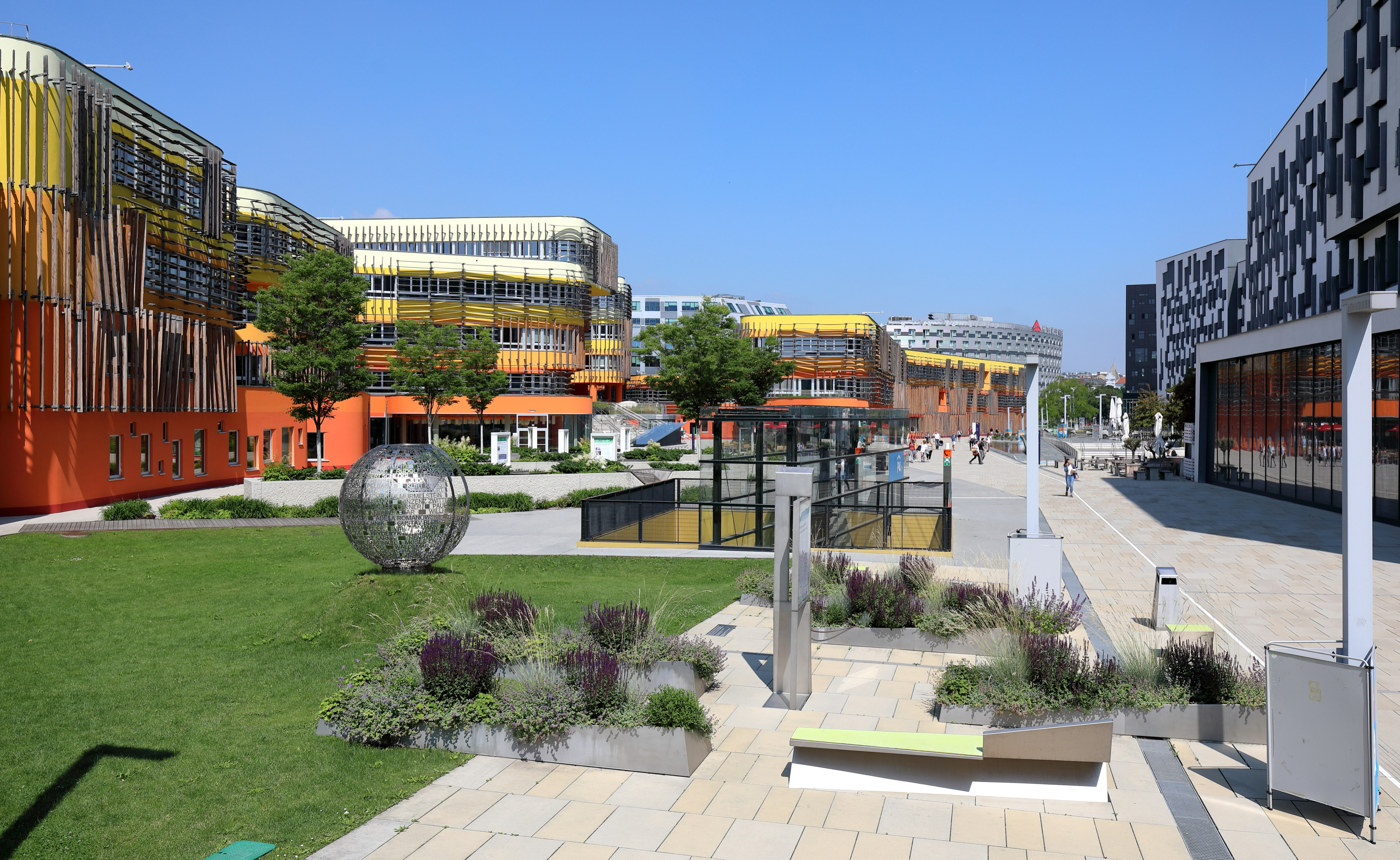
The northwest area of the campus

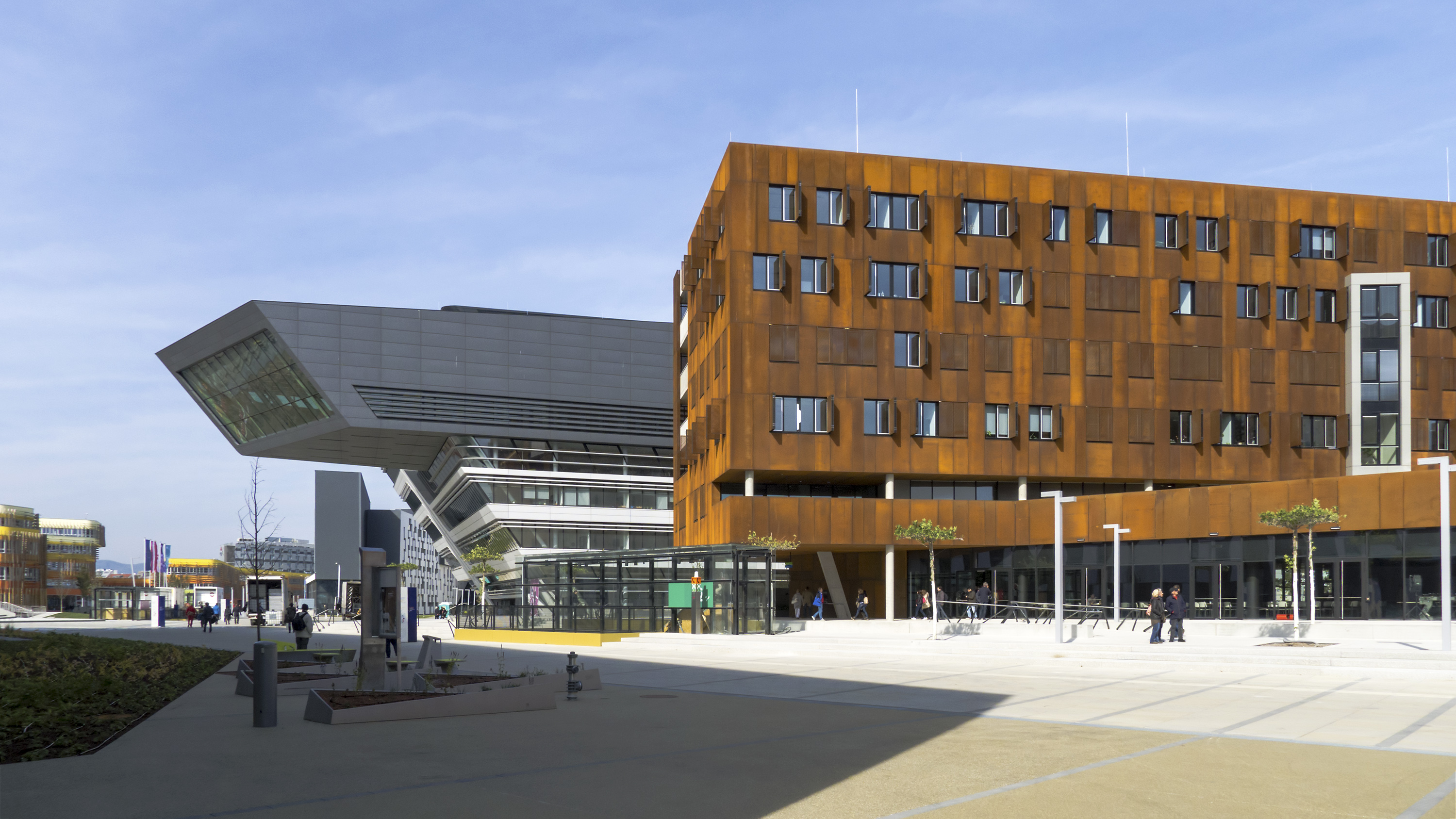
Library and Learning Center (left, architect: Zaha Hadid), Department building 1 (right, architect: Laura P. Spinadel)

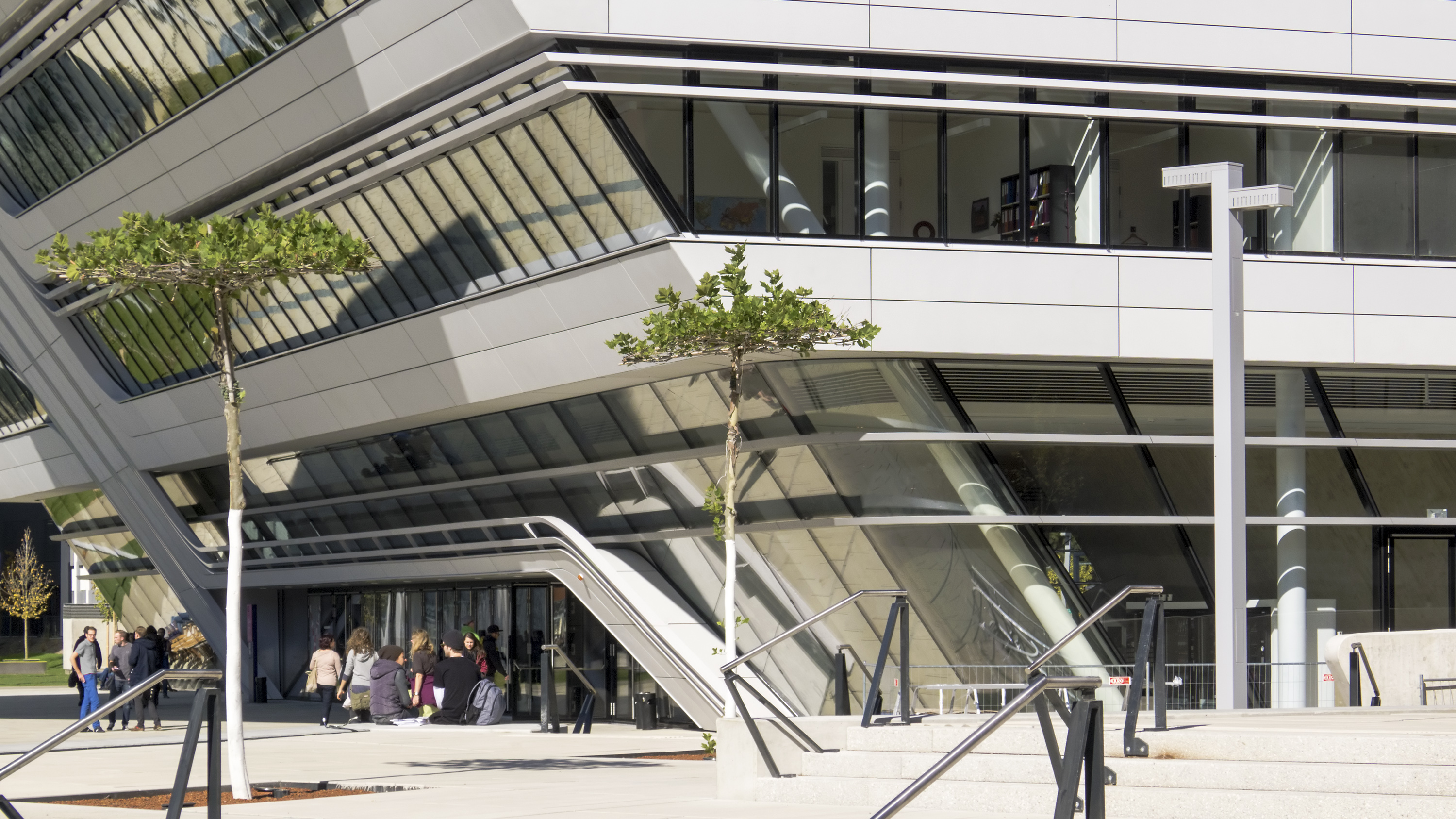
Entrance to the LC

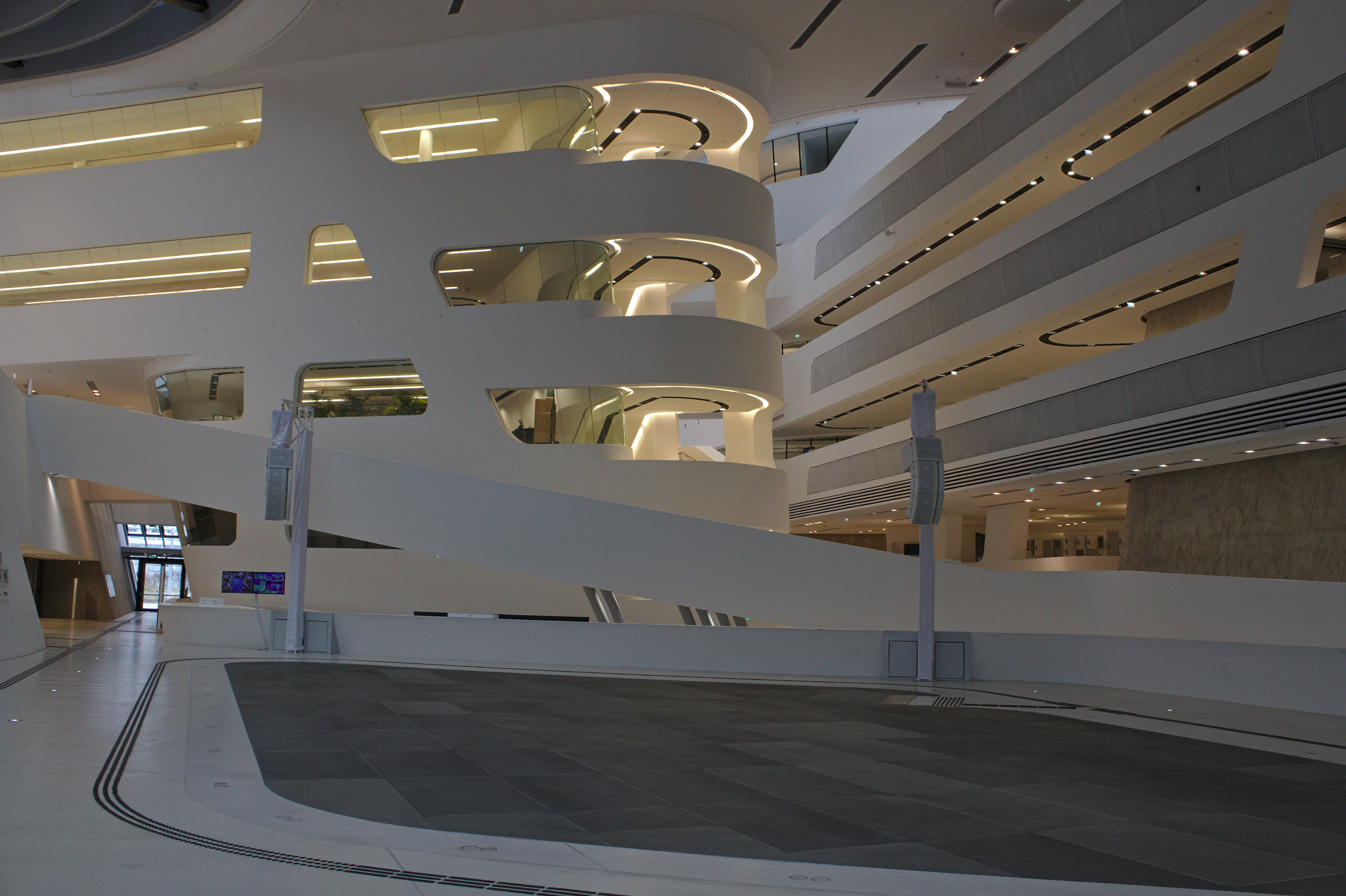
Interior of the LC

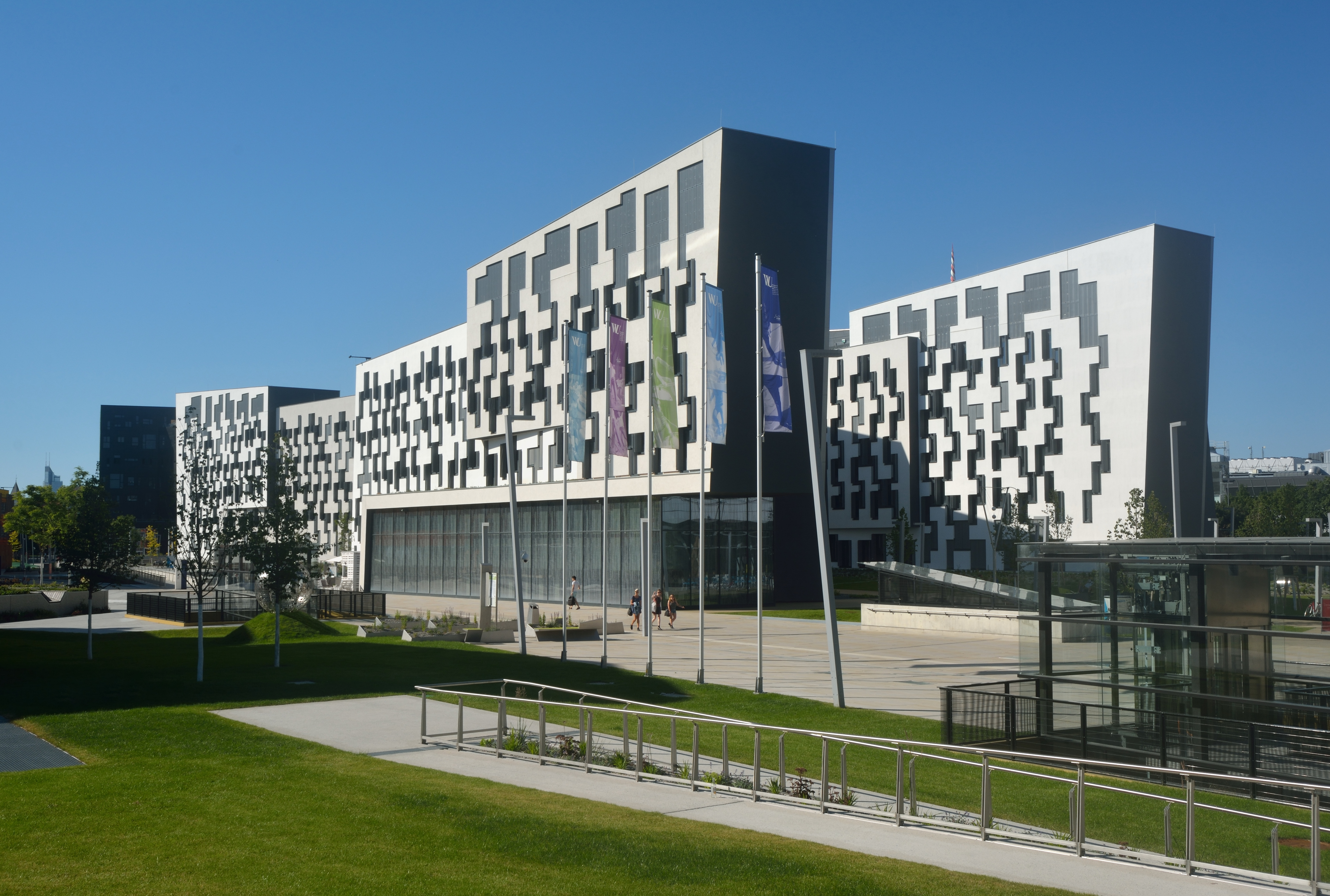
Department building 4, planned by Estudio Carme Pinós

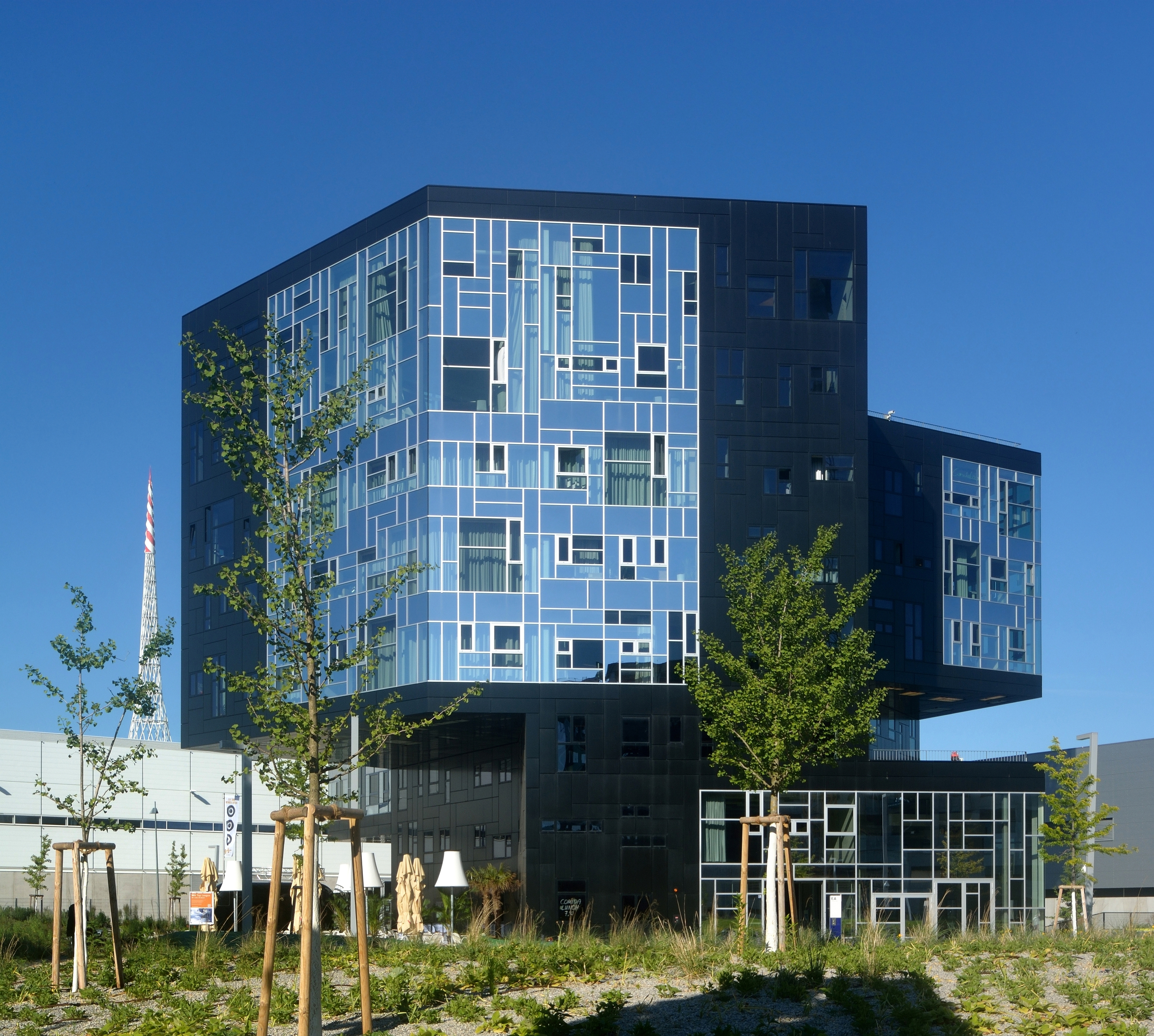
EA building (Executive Academy), planned by NO.MAD Arquitectos (Madrid)

The new location is dubbed Campus WU. Its construction began in 2009. Close to the Prater public park, and next to the exhibition centre of Vienna, the campus features 6 main building complexes resting on approximately 25 acres (10 ha). The master plan was created by BUSarchitektur under the guidance of the architect Laura P. Spinadel. The buildings of the campus were designed by architects from Spain, the United Kingdom, Germany, Japan, and Austria. The dominant element of the campus is the Library & Learning Center (LC), which was planned by Zaha Hadid.

With a total investment of 492 million euros and a planned construction period of 3 years, the project was concluded in 2013. Campus WU is situated close to the public transport hub Praterstern and is serviced by two stations of the underground line U2 and a number of buses. WU moved to the new site in September 2013, which is located at Welthandelsplatz 1, 1020 Vienna, Austria.

The LC features five cores with complex geometries, including inclined walls and rounded corners with varying radii. To construct these elements, a combination of standard and specially adapted formwork systems was used, including solutions for inclined and curved structural components.

== Program overview ==
The university offers three bachelor’s programs in business, economics, social sciences, and business law, including one English-taught degree in Business and Economics, alongside a wide range of German- and English-language master’s programs, doctoral/Ph.D. studies, and MBA and executive education programs. These programs cover fields such as business administration, economics, socioeconomics, quantitative finance, international management, business communication, and socio-ecological economics and policy.

== Rankings and accreditations ==
WU is one of the very few “triple crown” business schools worldwide, holding the three major international accreditations EQUIS, AACSB, and AMBA at the same time, a status reached by well under one percent of business schools globally.

In the QS Business Master’s Rankings 2027, of QS World University Rankings, WU’s MSc in Supply Chain Management is ranked 5th worldwide out of 142 programs and is also the best SCM master’s program in the German speaking area. In the same QS ranking family, WU’s Master’s in Marketing holds 13th place worldwide among 213 programs. WU also reports on several previous top rankings for other programs.

== Notable faculty ==
- Gustaf Neumann
- Christoph Badelt
- Christoph Grabenwarter
- Edeltraud Hanappi-Egger
- Manfred M. Fischer
- Ewald Nowotny
- Bodo Schlegelmilch
- Clive Spash
- Wolfgang Lutz
- Gabriel Felbermayr

== Notable alumni ==
=== Politicians ===
- Thomas Klestil (1932–2004), Austrian President (1992–2004)
- Franz Vranitzky (1937–), Austrian Chancellor (1986–1997)
- Ferdinand Lacina (1942–), Austrian Finance Minister (1986–1995)
- Hannes Androsch (1938–), Austrian Finance Minister (1970–1981) and Vice-Chancellor (1976–1981)
- Christoph Chorherr (1960–), Green Party Spokesperson (1996–1997)
- Madeleine Petrovic (1956–), Green Party Spokesperson (1994–1996)
- Wolf Klinz, Liberal Party member of the European Parliament (2004–present)
- Petra Steger, Freedom Party of Austria member of the National Council
- Andreas Salcher (1960–), member of the Vienna state parliament (1987–1999)
- Sixtus Lanner (1934–2022), Austrian MP
- Ilona Graenitz (1943–2022), Austrian MP and MEP

=== Entrepreneurs and managers ===
- Max Auschnitt (1888–1957), Chairman of Iron Domains and Factory and Titan-Nădrag-Călan
- Peter Brabeck-Letmathe (1944–), Chairman and CEO of Nestlé AG
- Oskar Deutsch (born 1963), entrepreneur and President of the Jewish Community of Vienna
- Hikmet Ersek (1961–), CEO of Western Union (2010–2013)
- Hans-Peter Haselsteiner (1944–), CEO of Strabag SE
- Peter Löscher (1957–), CEO of Siemens AG (2007–2013)
- Dietrich Mateschitz (1944–2022), Founder & CEO of Red Bull
- Wolfgang Porsche (1943–), Chairman of the Porsche AG, Porsche SE and Volkswagen AG supervisory boards
- Claus Raidl (1942–), former CEO of Böhler-Uddeholm, President of the Oesterreichische Nationalbank
- Walter Rothensteiner (1953–), CEO of Raiffeisen Zentralbank (1995–2017)

=== Diplomats ===
- Zygmunt Vetulani (1894–1941), Consul General of the Republic of Poland in Baghdad and Rio de Janeiro

=== Historians ===
- Juan Friede (1901–1990), Muisca scholar and historian of Colombia

=== Public institutions ===
- Maria Schaumayer (1931–2013), President of the Oesterreichische Nationalbank (1990–1995)
