= Stefan Fak =

Austrian businessperson

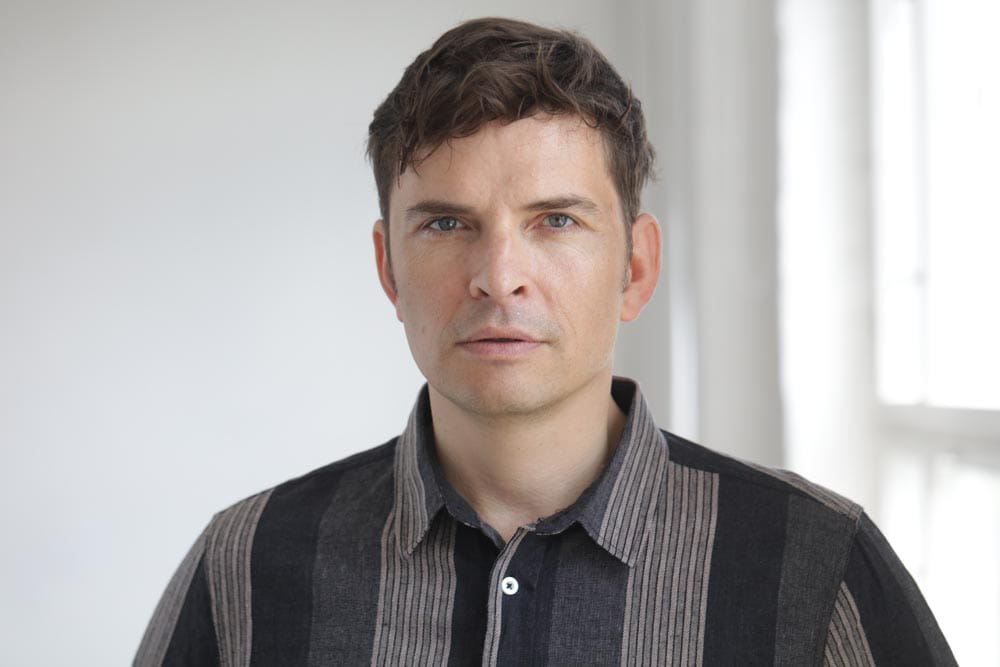
- Born: Stefan Fak; 1972 (age 53–54); Vienna, Austria
- Education: Vienna University of Economics and Business (BS)
- Occupation: Business Consultant

Stefan Fak is an Austrian businessperson who is the founder of Lotao. He also hosts the Food Fak(t) podcast.

== Biography ==
Stefan Fak was born in Vienna, Austria, in 1972. He studied economics, which led to his initial career in the telecommunications industry. After completing his education, Fak joined an Austrian mobile phone operator, where he worked in the information technology department for a year. His interest in innovation and organizational improvement later led him to a position in organizational development at the Vienna University of Economics and Business, where he worked directly under the rector. Later, he joined the Austrian Tourism Association.

In 2009, Fak left his position as the head of the Austrian Tourism Association in Germany to pursue social projects in Asia. He developed an interest in rice during his visit to the Mekong Delta region. Subsequently, Fak established a rice farmers' cooperative in Indonesia and imported an organic rice blend, despite facing initial regulatory challenges.

Later, Fak expanded his business, found different rice varieties from India and China. He collaborated with a rice expert from the University of Hawaiʻi to refine a green rice product using organic bamboo leaf tea. In 2010, Fak founded Lotao, a company based in Germany that sells these specialized rice varieties. He has been described as a risolier, which means a rice expert.

In 2017, Fak worked with DEG to launch a development aid project focused on jackfruit, which led to the production of plant-based ready meals.

In October 2025, Fak stepped down as managing director of Lotao after 16 years in the role. After leaving the company, he began working as a business consultant
