= Robert Holzmann =

Austrian economist

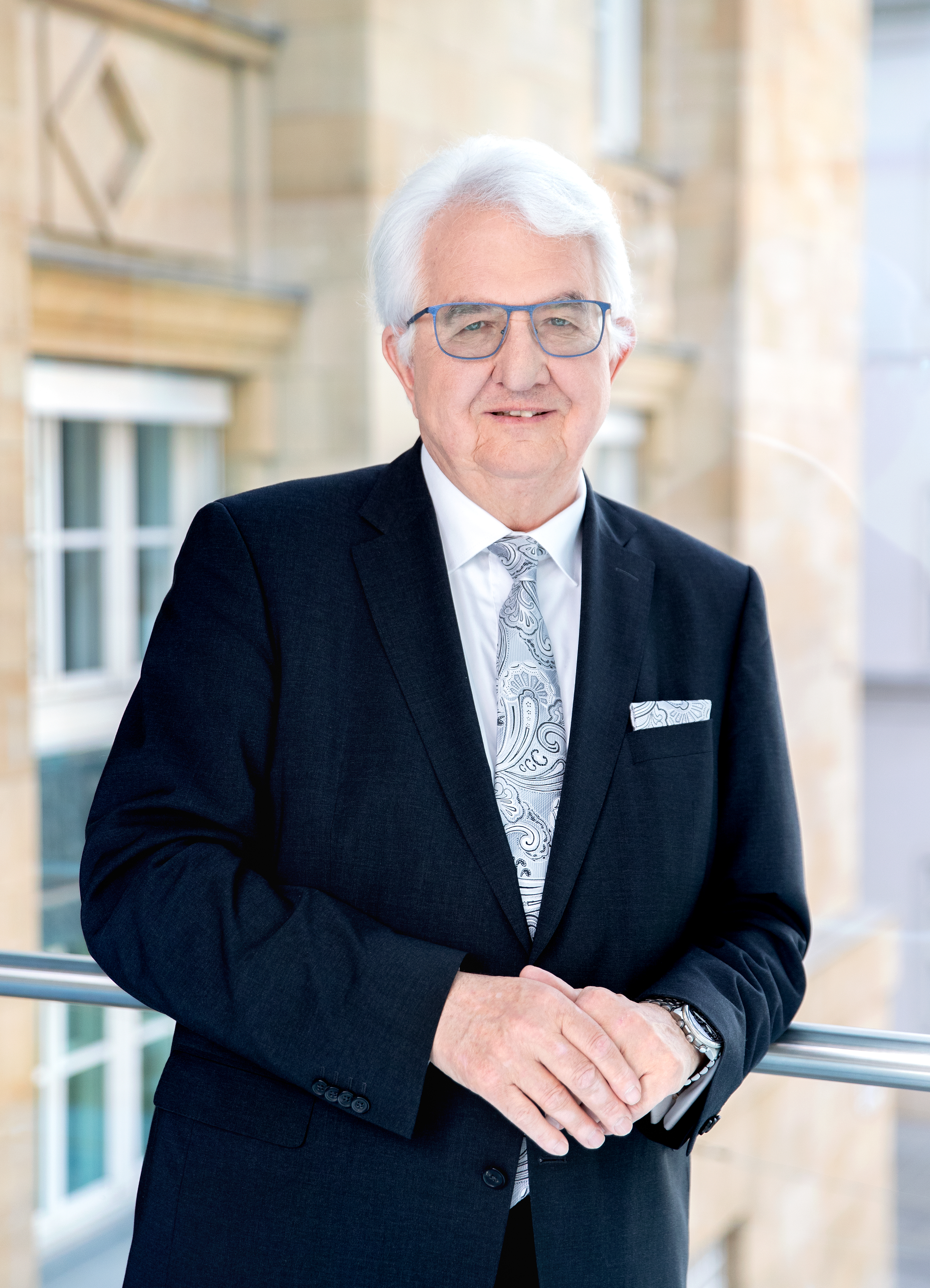
Robert Holzmann, Copyright: Central Bank of Austria

Robert Holzmann (born February 27, 1949, in Leoben, Austria) is an Austrian economist who was Governor of Austria’s central bank, the Oesterreichische Nationalbank (OeNB) from 2019 to 2025. His term of appointment runs from September 1, 2019, to August 31, 2025.

From 1997 to 2011, he held various positions at the World Bank in Washington, D.C., United States, including Sector Director (1997–2009), Research Director (2009–2011) and Acting Senior Vice President (2002–2003). Before and thereafter he held positions in academia and international organizations.

== Professional career ==
From 1985, Robert Holzmann worked for the Organisation for Economic Co-operation and Development (OECD) in Paris, France, and from 1988 as a senior economist for the International Monetary Fund (IMF) in Washington, D.C., USA. In 1992, he assumed a full professorship in International Economic Relations and European Economics at Saarland University in Saarbrücken, Germany, where he also served as Executive Director of the Europa-Institut. In 1997, World Bank President James D. Wolfensohn appointed Robert Holzmann Sector Director and Sector Board Head in Social Protection and Labor at the World Bank in Washington, D.C., USA. In 2002–2003, he also served as Acting Senior Vice President of the World Bank, and from 2009 as a Research Director. In addition, he was a long-term head of the Ludwig Boltzmann Institute (LBI) for the analysis of economic policy activities in Vienna, Austria.

In 2003, Robert Holzmann became Research Fellow at today’s IZA Institute of Labor Economics in Bonn, Germany, and he is also Research Network Fellow of CES ifo in Munich, Germany. He also held visiting professorships, inter alia, at Hitotsubashi University, Tokyo, Japan (1991), the Pontifical Catholic University of Chile, Santiago de Chile (1995), the Southwestern University of Finance and Economics, Chengdu, China (honorary professorship, 2010), and the University of New South Wales, Sydney, Australia (honorary professorship, 2013). From 2012 to 2015, he held a foundation chair at the University of Malaya in Kuala Lumpur, Malaysia, where he became Distinguished Research Fellow in 2016.

In September 2019, Robert Holzmann became Governor of the Oesterreichische Nationalbank (OeNB). In this capacity, he was a member of the Governing Council of the European Central Bank (ECB), Austria’s governor on the International Monetary Fund’s Board of Governors and member of the General Board of the European Systemic Risk Board (ESRB). In addition, he attended the Governors’ meetings of the Bank for International Settlements (BIS).

== Publications ==
Holzmann published 39 books, 94 contributions to books, 48 articles in refereed journals, 29 articles in non-refereed economic policy journals, 22 other publications and numerous discussion papers, research papers and strategic papers in German, English, French and Spanish. A number of books and articles have been translated into Arabic, Chinese, German, Russian and Spanish.
