= Gustaf Neumann =

Austrian computer scientist

Gustaf Neumann is an Austrian computer scientist who is specialised in information systems. He is a full professor and the chair of the Institute for Information Systems and New Media at the Vienna University of Economics and Business (WU Wien). Neumann is one of the authors of Wirtschaftsinformatik, which is the bestseller book on Information Systems in German speaking countries with more than 500.000 copies.

== Personal life ==
Gustaf Neumann is native of Vienna, Austria, born in 1958. His father, Gustaf Adolf Neumann, was an Austrian investigative journalist and newspaper editor.

== Awards ==
- 1987 Heinz-Zemanek award of the Austrian Association of Computer Science (OCG)
- 1988 Senator Wilhelm Wilfling Price
- 2010 Tcl Community Service Award

== Publications ==
Gustaf Neumann has published more than 200 books and papers in the areas of program transformation, data modeling, and information systems technology with a focus on e-learning applications. His book Wirtschaftsinformatik is one of the bestsellers in German Speaking countries.
