= Centravis =

Ukrainian company

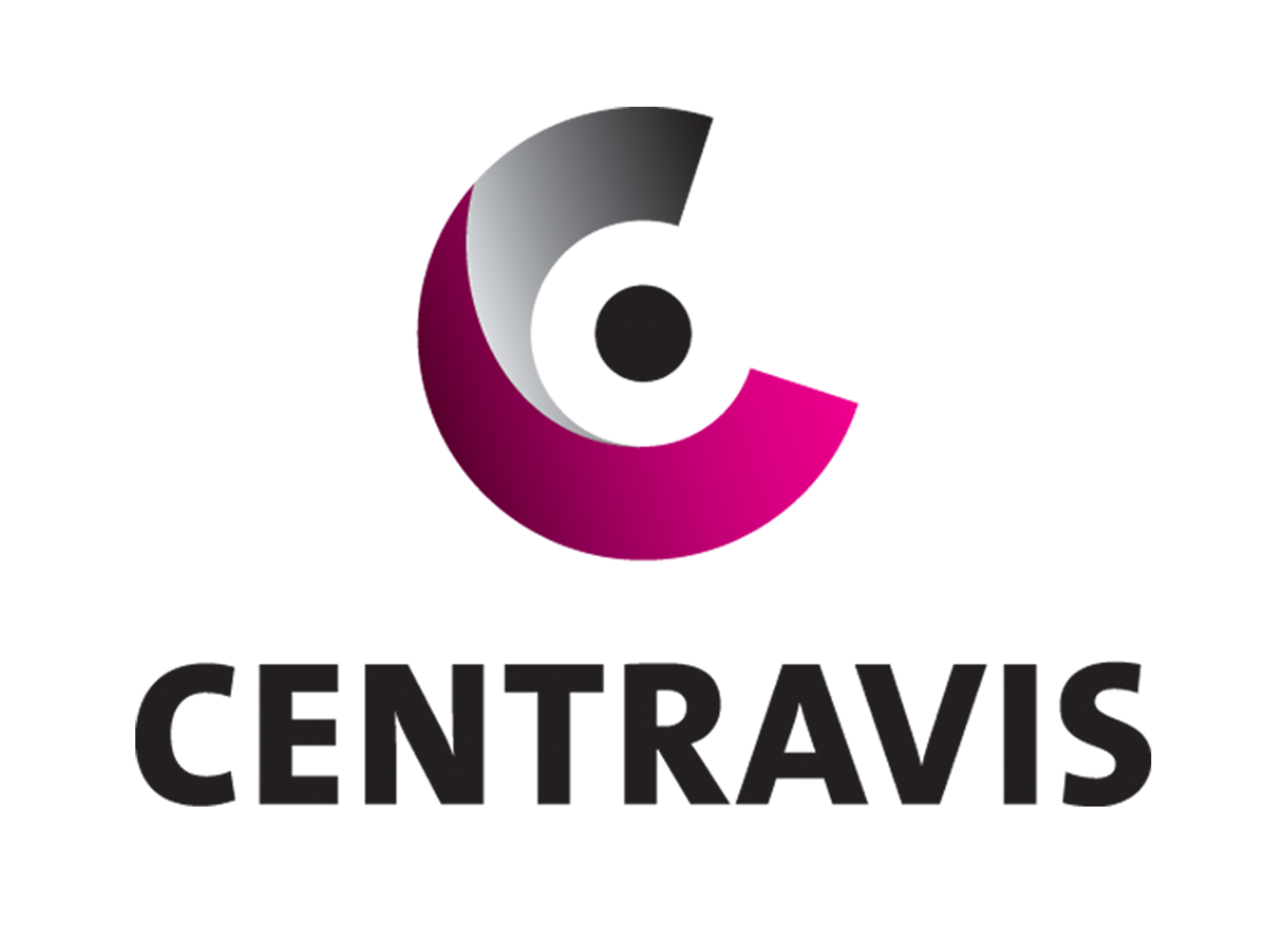
- Type: Private Joint Stock Company (PrJSC)
- Industry: Metallurgy
- Founded: 2000
- Headquarters: Nikopol, Ukraine
- Key people: Yuriy Atanasov, CEO
- Products: Seamless stainless steel pipes and tubes
- Revenue: €160 million (2018)
- Website: http://centravis.com/

Centravis (also Centravis or PrJSC "Centravis Production Ukraine") is a company specializing in production of seamless stainless steel pipes and tubes. The company's headquarters are located in Nikopol, with production facilities in both Nikopol and Uzhhorod.

== History ==
The production site includes a hot extrusion shop and a cold-drawing shop, which, until 2000, were part of the largest in Ukraine industrial complex for seamless pipe production, the Nikopol Southern Pipe Plant (NPTZ). In 1959, the drawing shop No. 2 started operating and produced its first cold-drawn pipe. In 1961, hot extrusion shop No. 4 was commissioned.

In the 1990s, during the post-communist privatization phase, industrial complex for seamless pipe production was formed as a family business by the Atanasov family. The new holding included the stainless steel pipe mill in Nikopol and an extensive network of trade companies and agents in Western Europe, the USA, and CIS countries. The company began its transformation from a regional leader into an international player capable of competing globally.

In 2007, the "Centravis" brand was introduced to the global metallurgy industry. The official launch took place on 6 November 2007, at the Stainless Steel World exhibition in Maastricht, Netherlands.

During that period, a comprehensive modernization program was implemented at the company's production facilities, with a total investment exceeding 130 million USD. This included the installation of a new high-performance press line in the extrusion shop, featuring advanced equipment from German manufacturers SMS MEER and IAS. In the drawing shop, several upgrades were made, including the introduction of KPW-25 cold-rolling mills, flexible U-shaped tube machines, a continuous heat-exchanger tube production line, and an updated quality control system.

In 2022, despite regular shelling in Nikopol and the difficult situation in the region and country following the full-scale war, Centravis continued operating.

The company helps its employees, the Defense Security Forces, and civilians affected by the hostilities. During 2022, Centravis provided over UAH 9 million in aid.

In 2023, the company opened a new specialised production facility in Uzhhorod, in a bid to move production away from the frontline city of Nikopol. The new niche, specialised facility manufactures small-diameter cold-drawn pipes, for use in precision applications such as automotive fuel lines, aimed at export customers such as the EU automotive industry. The total investment amounted to over 50 million UAH. In the first half of 2023, the Uzhhorod facility produced approximately 176 tons or over 900,000 meters of tubular products for automobiles, which is enough to equip around 450,000 to 600,000 cars.

In July 2026, Centravis announced the mothballing of its plant in Uzhhorod, only three years after its opening, due to restrictions imposed on Ukrainian products as part of the EU Carbon Border Adjustment Mechanism. General Manager Yuriy Atanasov stated that the country had failed to defend its economic position in negotiations with the EU, and that new restrictions would significantly impact the wider Ukrainian economy. Atanasov warned that the country risks the loss of its export market, and associated foreign exchange earnings, in the face of competition from China and India. The company reported that EU quota restrictions could result in a loss of 43 to 47% of exports to Europe. The quota for the country is set at 6,524 tons, while in 2025 exports amounted to 11,306 tons. All existing production would be consolidated to the companies facilities in Nikopol.

In 2026, Yuriy Atanasov, chief executive officer of Centravis, received the Stainless & Special Steel Executive of the Year Award. Centravis is the only Ukrainian company whose representative has received this international award.

== Products ==
The company's product portfolio includes over 1,000 sizes of pipes made from more than 100 grades of corrosion-resistant and heat-resistant steel in 8 segments.

In 2023, Centravis introduced Balev 304L and Balev 316L, cutting-edge stainless steel grades engineered for high-pressure conditions. Developed through proprietary heat treatment technology, these grades offer enhanced strength and corrosion resistance while being lighter than traditional materials.

Centravis has developed specialized tubes for hydrogen applications, known as H2FIT tubes. These products meet the requirements for hydrogen service, including high-pressure and high-purity environments. The company supplied H2FIT tubes to Germany's Voss Production for use in hydrogen filling stations, supporting the growing hydrogen economy in Europe.

The main application areas for Centravis products are the automotive industry, chemical and petrochemical industries, mechanical engineering, and power generation, including nuclear energy.

== Export markets ==
More than 95% of the company's products are exported. Centravis ranks in the top 50 of Ukraine's largest exporters.

The company sells its products in various regions worldwide, including the European Union, United States, Asia and the Middle East, and Australia.

The total export volume in 2022 reached 11.6 thousand tons of seamless stainless steel pipes.

Centravis has its own sales offices in countries such as Germany, Italy, Switzerland, Poland, United States and United Arab Emirates and is actively pursuing an export strategy.

In recent years, the company has participated in several notable projects, including a NASA space exploration project, the construction of the new Hinkley Point C nuclear power plant in the United Kingdom, and the International Thermonuclear Experimental Reactor (ITER) project.
