= Antonio Marcegaglia =

Italian businessman

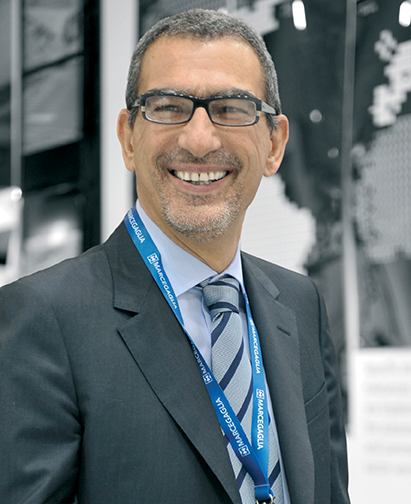
- Marcegaglia in 2011
- Born: December 12, 1963 (age 62); Mantua, Italy
- Education: Luigi Bocconi University
- Occupation: Business executive
- Known for: CEO of steel manufacturer company Marcegaglia

Antonio Marcegaglia (born in Mantua on 12 December 1963) is an Italian business executive who is the Chairman and CEO of steel manufacturer Marcegaglia.

== Early life and education ==
Antonio Marcegaglia was born Mantua, Italy in 1963 and obtained an honours degree in business studies from Milan's Luigi Bocconi University in 1987.

== Career ==
After graduating he joined his families business Marcegaglia full-time. He forged an indissoluble bond between his personal career and the growth of this mid-sized Italian steel making company, later transforming it into a major global player.

=== Leadership ===
After Antonio Marcegaglia became CEO he embarked on diversification of the group with the establishment of Bioindustrie Mantovane and the acquisition of Oskar of Osteria Grande (Bologna), Nuova Omec, Ennepi of Lugo di Romagna (Ravenna) and Imat of Fontanafredda (Pordenone) in 1988 and of CCT of Gallarate (Varese) and Elet.Ca of Capalle (Florence) in 1989, as well as the foundation in 1989 of Marcegaglia Impianti of Saronno (Varese). In the same year, Marcegaglia acquired holdings in Fergallo of Motteggiana (Mantua), SIM of Sant'Atto (Teramo) and Elletre of Montebello Vicentino (Vicenza). In 1991 the Group acquired Resco Tubi of Cusago (Milan) and OMF of Fiume Veneto (Pordenone). In 1994 it acquired Brollo Profilati of Desio (Milan), later moved to the “former Breda” area just outside Milan, on a site totalling 8 hectares purchased in 1996, and then in 1995 ETA Euro Tubi Acciaio of Milan, followed by a stake in Allu's of Sesto al Reghena (Pordenone).

The group expand into new sectors that included metal household items, electrostatic paint for metals and metal components for the electrical appliance industry. Meanwhile, its metallurgical sector grew with the production of fine stainless steel tubes and cold-rolled profiles.

In 1996, the Euro Energy Group was also established in order to create plants for the production of energy from renewable sources. In January 1997 Nuova Forsidera Spa, specialising in steel cold rolling and galvanising processes, was acquired with its plants in Corsico (Milan) and Albignasego (Padua). In that same year came the acquisition of Astra of Mezzolara, Budrio (Bologna), and the Siderplating establishment was also acquired, under the name of Marcegaglia San Giorgio of Nogaro (Udine), producing rolling mill plates.

Antonio Marcegaglia's corporate development programme continued in 1999 with the acquisition of Morteo Nord of Pozzolo Formigaro (Alessandria), and Ponteggi Dalmine of Milan, Graffignana (Lodi) and Potenza. This was followed in 2001 by the acquisition, in the tourism sector, of the holiday resort of Pugnochiuso, situated on the Gargano promontory in Apulia.

In December 2001, large production centre was opened in Ravenna, the second largest iron and steel centre in Italy. And in 2002, in the former Belleli area in Taranto, its second largest production plant in the South, after the one in Potenza, entered into operation. In 2003, the sector of products for the household electrical appliance industry expanded further with the acquisition of BVB of San Lorenzo in Campo (Pesaro). While in 2004 the group took a fundamental step in the development of its activities in the tourism sector by acquiring, with Banca Intesa and the Ifil group, 49% of Sviluppo Italia Turismo

In 2007 Antonio Marcegaglia acquired the stake in Gabetti Property Solutions and upgraded the Ravenna plant with a further investment of 300 million euros. The Group continued its expansion in the energy sector where, with its subsidiary Arendi, began production of photovoltaic panels. Likewise, its presence in tourism grew further with the acquisition of the management of Forte Village of Santa Margherita di Pula, in Sardinia, the largest hotel complex in Italy and Europe. This was followed soon after by the “Le Tonnare” holiday resort in Stintino, in the province of Sassari. In 2007 the production plant at Boltiere (Bergamo) was also enlarged. In 2008 the Group acquired the holiday location at Castel Monastero di Castelnuovo Berardenga (Siena) and the "Former Arsenale" property complex at La Maddalena (Sassari).

Since 2017, following the assignment of the Ilva Group to AM Investco (the joint-venture consisting of ArcelorMittal and Marcegaglia), Antonio Marcegaglia has been promoting the relaunch of this European steelworks asset. The objective was to strengthen its position as a market leader and to increase the company's market share in the European and World iron and steel works industry.

=== Internationalisation ===
In 1989, Antonio Marcegaglia launched the Marcegaglia Group's internationalisation policy which has strengthened its direct presence in the international markets.

Marcegaglia Deutschland of Düsseldorf was established in 1989 for the distribution of the Group's own products on the German market and in Scandinavia. United Stainless Steel was also created in the UK near London, followed by Marcegaglia U.K., for the production of welded tubes from hot and cold rolled strip, and then by Marcegaglia UK at Dudley, West Midlands.

In 1991 Antonio Marcegaglia launched the project which would see the group enter into the transatlantic markets. In the second half of the year The New Bishop Tube of Philadelphia was acquired in the US, and, in February 1992, Damascus of Greenville. Two major production units which then led to the creation of Damascus-Bishop Tube Company, specialising in the production of stainless steel.

In 1993 Antonio Marcegaglia acquired the Belgian Cotubel group, a distributor of stainless steel products and tubes in France and Benelux, and founded the trading company Central Bright Steel for the distribution of welded tubes in the UK; it also began production of these same products near Birmingham in 1997.

In the summer of 1998, a large industrial area in Munhall, near Pittsburgh, was acquired to accommodate the new Marcegaglia USA, which would also incorporate the Damascus-Bishop Tube Company.

During the same period, two other companies were formed in the United States, as subsidiaries of the parent companies in Italy: Oskar Usa in Birmingham (Alabama) and Oto Mills Usa in Wheaton (Illinois).

In 1999 Antonio Marcegaglia's efforts led to the incorporation of Marcegaglia Iberica, Marcegaglia Ireland, Marcegaglia France, Marcegaglia Austria and Marcegaglia do Brasil, the latter tripling its turnover by 2005, extending its plant and taking the number of its employees to 1000. Meanwhile, in Bremen, in joint venture with the Arbed Group, the first Marcegaglia company to produce quality steel was formed.

In 2000, the Group acquired Earcanal of Leioa, Spain. Following the joint venture with Arbed, in 2004 the Marcegaglia Group signed an agreement with the Corus group for the 10-year co-management of its British Teesside Steelworks, guaranteeing the supply at cost price of one million tonnes per year of slabs for the production of coils and sheets. Oto Mills do Brasil was founded in San Paolo in the same year.

In 2005 the Group proceeded with the expansion of Marcegaglia do Brasil, and in June Antonio Marcegaglia opened its fourth overseas production plant in Praszka (Poland), to manufacture tubes for refrigeration, panels and corrugated steel sheets. One year later, 20 kilometres away, the plant at Kluczbork was added, for the production of tubes and drawn products. Marcegaglia established Marcegaglia Gulf at Doha, Qatar in 2007. The expansion of its industrial activities continued in 2008 with its entry into China, where, in Yangzhou, 350 km north-west of Shanghai, it created its first Asian plant for the production of stainless steel tubes and high-precision carbon steel, with the establishment of Marcegaglia Romania at Cluj, and with the start of work on the new production plant at Vladimir, Russia.

In October 2013, following the passing of his father Steno, founder of the group, Antonio Marcegaglia is appointed Chairman of Marcegaglia group.

== Recognition ==
Antonio Marcegaglia has been awarded Stainless Steel Executive of the Year 2010 at 9th Stainless & Special Steel Summit in Rome

In 2024, he is awarded the Ceo Italian Awards 2024 in the Industry category by Forbes Italia in Milan.
