= Bodo Schlegelmilch =

Association of MBAs chair

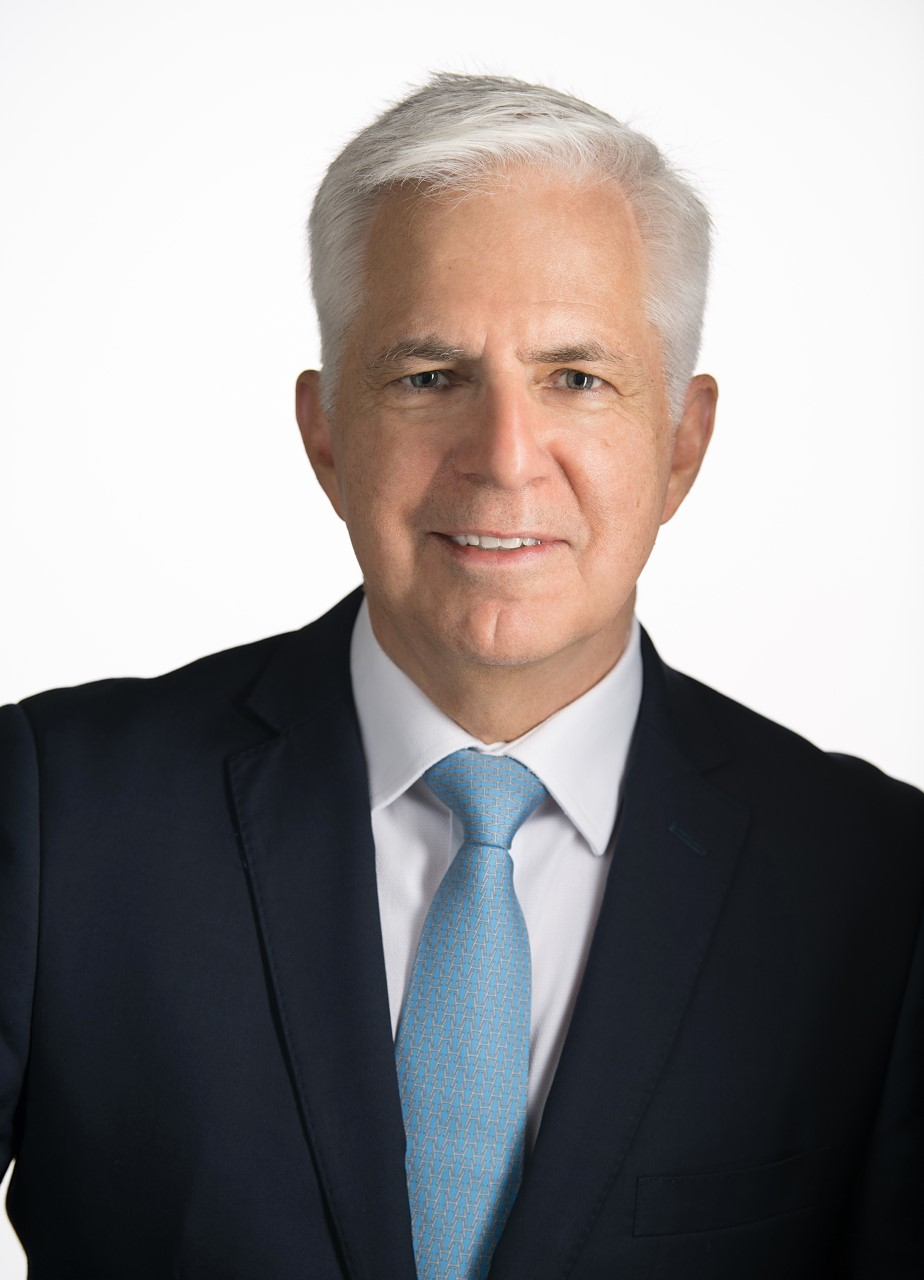
Bodo Schlegelmilch

Bodo B. Schlegelmilch is Professor Emeritus of Global Marketing Strategy at Vienna University of Economics and Business (WU), Vienna, Austria. He was the founding dean of the WU Executive Academy and serves as its Dean Emeritus. From 2018 to 2023, he served as Chair and Trustee of the Association of MBAs (AMBA) and the Business Graduate Association (BGA).

Schlegelmilch is a Fellow of the Academy of International Business, the Academy of Marketing Science and the Chartered Institute of Marketing. The American Marketing Association conferred on him the Significant Contributions to Global Marketing Award, and the Lifetime Achievement Award for Higher Education, the Academy of Marketing Science the 2023 Marketer of the Year Award, and Thammasat University appointed him to a Bualuang ASEAN Chair Professorship.

== Biography ==
Schlegelmilch earned his bachelor's degree at the University of Applied Sciences in Cologne and his master's degree, Ph.D., and Doctor of Letters (D.Litt.) from the University of Manchester. He also holds an honorary Ph.D. from Thammasat University in Bangkok. He served for 12 years as Dean of the WU Executive Academy at the Vienna University of Economics and Business, where he initiated several MBA programs. As Academic Director, he led the Vienna Executive MBA program into the Financial Times Global Top-50 ranking.

Starting at Deutsche Bank and Procter & Gamble, he continued his career at the University of Edinburgh and the University of California, Berkeley. Appointments as British Rail Chair of Marketing at the University of Wales and Professor of International Business at Thunderbird School of Global Management followed.

== Publications ==
Schlegelmilch has been listed among the world's most prolific authors in international marketing. He has published more than a dozen books on different marketing and management topics, including widely noted textbooks in English, German and Mandarin:

- Schlegelmilch, Bodo B., Global Marketing Strategy: An Executive Digest (Second Edition). 2022. Cham: Springer, ISBN 9783030906641. The various editions of this book are held in 364 libraries, according to WorldCat.
- Schlegelmilch, Bodo B and Winer R.S. (eds.), The Routledge Companion to Strategic Marketing, Routledge. 2021. ISBN 9781351038669.
- Schlegelmilch, B.B. and WU, H., Global Marketing Strategy: A Digest for Chinese Managers, Sun Yat-sen University Press, 2021.
- Keegan W.J., Schlegelmilch B.B. and Stöttinger B., Globales Marketing-Management. Eine europäische Perspektive, Oldenbourg Verlag, 2002. ISBN 3-486-25005-1.

His research spans international marketing strategy, corporate social responsibility and cultural differences and has been published in a variety of academic journals (e.g. Strategic Management Journal, Journal of International Business Studies and Journal of the Academy of Marketing Science).

== Other ==
Schlegelmilch put the "degrees for rent" concept for discussion, which calls for abolishing the current university practice of awarding degrees for life to students. Instead, Schlegelmilch suggests that degrees should be awarded only for a fixed period, after which graduates would need to continuously top up with additional courses to maintain the validity of their degree (a key tenet of lifelong education). ("Why MBAs should keep going back to school", Financial Times, January 3, 2019) Schlegelmilch also called for radical innovations of business Schools.
