= Ewald Nowotny =

Austrian economist and politician (born 1944)

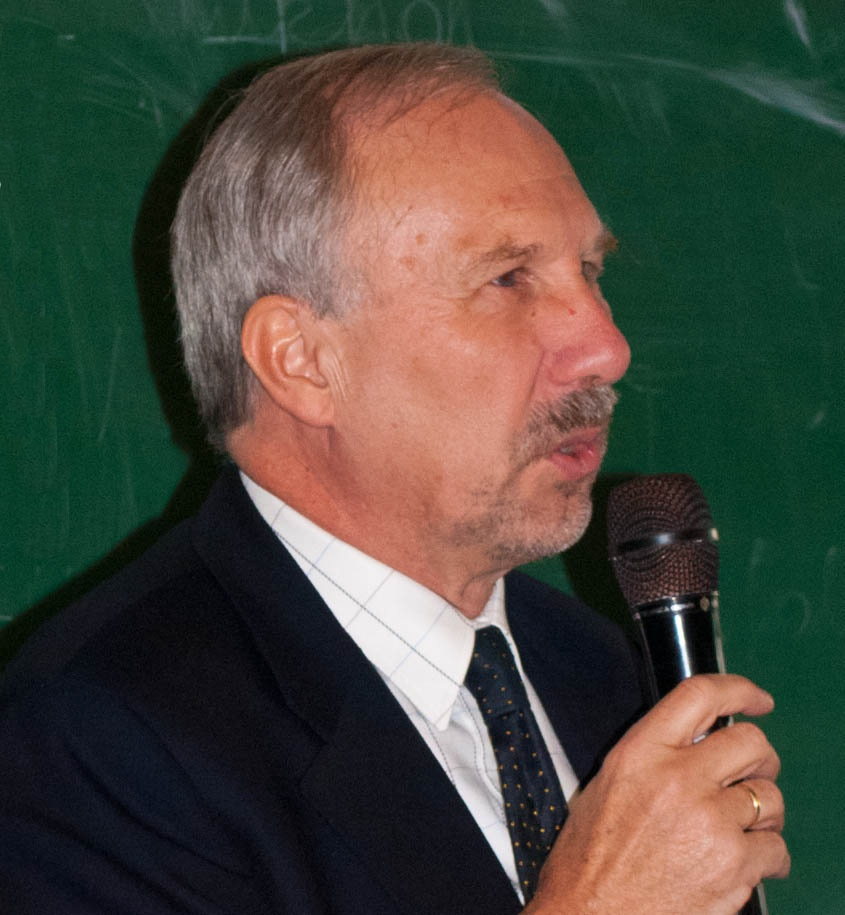
Ewald Nowotny, 2009

Ewald Nowotny (German pronunciation: [ˌeːvalt noˈvɔtniː]) (born June 28, 1944, in Vienna) is an Austrian economist and social democratic politician and former governor of Austria's central bank Oesterreichische Nationalbank. He was also a member of the European Central Bank’s governing council.

== Early life and education ==
Nowotny graduated with a doctorate from the University of Vienna in 1966, took his habilitation at the Johannes Kepler University Linz in 1972 and was a full professor at the Vienna University of Economics and Business from 1981 until 2008.

== Political career ==
Since 1974, Nowotny has held various functions in the Austrian Social Democratic Party. He was a member of the National Council, the more important chamber of the Austrian parliament, from 1978 to 1999.

== Career at financial institutions ==
From 1999 to 2003, Nowotny was vice president of the European Investment Bank in Luxembourg. From the beginning of 2006 until mid-2008, he was CEO of BAWAG P.S.K. During his time in office, he managed BAWAG’s sale to US buyout-fund Cerberus Capital.

Since September 2008 Nowotny has served as Governor in Austria's central bank Oesterreichische Nationalbank and as a member of the ECB governing council. With the 2011 round of the Greek financial crisis, "[s]ome analysts [saw] signs of growing tensions between European officials and the ratings agencies" and Nowotny gave voice to the concern, saying "that rating companies were making it more difficult to stabilize the Greek debt situation. 'We have a somewhat strange situation. The banks themselves are ready, because they also have an interest in that, to stabilize Greece,' Nowotny said in Vienna, according to Dow Jones Newswires. 'The ratings agencies are being in this European matter much stricter and more aggressive than in, for example, similar cases in South America.'” In summer 2011, Nowotny said it's the ECB's responsibility to decide whether or not to accept Greek debt as collateral in case rating agencies slap the country with a default rating. “At the end of the day it has to be the decision of the ECB. The ECB should not be totally dependent on rating agencies,” Nowotny said in an interview with CNBC. “It is our own responsibility, our own decision. We have proved this in the case of Ireland, Greece and Portugal, with regard to what kind of collateral we accept.” In May 2015, with a new round of the Greek government-debt crisis, Nowotny said while discussions "may be refreshing by bringing in new ideas" "but at the end of the day, they must [end in] results", adding that discussions are "not about playing games" and are "more a political question than an economic question." He said at the same time that he "doesn't see the ECB's role as creating a federalized financial government inside the euro zone."

He wants to regulate and have legal restraint at Bitcoin.

== Other activities ==
=== Corporate boards ===
- Scope Group, Member of the Advisory
- Rantum Capital, Member of the Advisory Board

=== International organizations ===
- European Central Bank (ECB), Ex-Officio Member of the Governing Council
- European Systemic Risk Board (ESRB), Ex-Officio Member
- International Monetary Fund (IMF), ex-officio member of the board of governors

=== Non-profit organizations ===
- Austrian Institute of Economic Research (WIFO), member of the board
- Vienna University of Economics and Business (WU), member of the board of trustees
- European Forum Alpbach, member of the council
- Trilateral Commission, member of the European Group

== Personal life ==
Nowotny is married and has a son. His private interests include reading, collecting old books, sailing, archaeology and modern art.
