= Yuriy Atanasov =

Ukrainian industrialist-steelmaker and top executive

- Юрій Атанасов
- Born: 1964 (age 61–62); Nikopol, Ukraine
- Citizenship: Ukraine
- Education: Dnipropetrovsk Metallurgical Institute, TRIUM EMBA
- Occupation: Business executive
- Known for: Co-owner and CEO of Centravis

Yuriy Atanasov (born 1964) is a Ukrainian businessman and industrial executive. He is the co-owner and chief executive officer of Centravis, a Ukrainian manufacturer of seamless stainless steel tubes headquartered in Nikopol, Ukraine. He has led the company since September 2009. The company's customers include major industrial and automotive manufacturers.

== Biography ==
Atanasov was born in 1964 in Nikopol, Ukraine. He studied at the Dnipropetrovsk Metallurgical Institute, graduating in 1986 with a qualification in engineering and economics. In 2009 he earned an MBA degree from the NYU Stern School of Business by completing the TRIUM Global Executive MBA program.

Atanasov comes from a family with a background in the Ukrainian metallurgical industry. His father, Vasyl Atanasov, established the family business together with his wife, Iryna, and their sons Yuriy and Serhiy. The business initially operated under the name UVIS, an acronym formed from the first letters of the family members' names. It was subsequently developed into Centravis.

On 22 September 2009, Atanasov was appointed chief executive officer of Centravis Production Ukraine. At the time of his appointment, he was already one of the company's principal shareholders and chaired the boards of directors of Centravis Production Ukraine and its holding company. During Atanasov's tenure, Centravis expanded its international operations and diversifying its export markets. The company became an important supplier of stainless steel tubes for automotive fuel systems, including those used by BMW and Volkswagen. It also expanded its business in the United States and Japan.

In September 2026, Atanasov discussed the impact of changes to European Union steel import quotas and the Carbon Border Adjustment Mechanism (CBAM) on Ukrainian stainless steel producers. He also addressed the suspension of production at the company's Uzhhorod facility and the challenges of maintaining industrial operations in Nikopol amid the ongoing war.

== Awards and recognition ==
In September 2026, Atanasov received the Stainless Steel Executive of the Year 2026 award, presented by Steel & Metals Market Research (SMR) at its International Stainless & Special Steel Conference in Offenbach, Germany. He was unanimously selected for the award by a seven-member committee. The distinction was presented for the nineteenth time.
