= Maria Schaumayer =

Austrian politician and central banker (1931–2013)

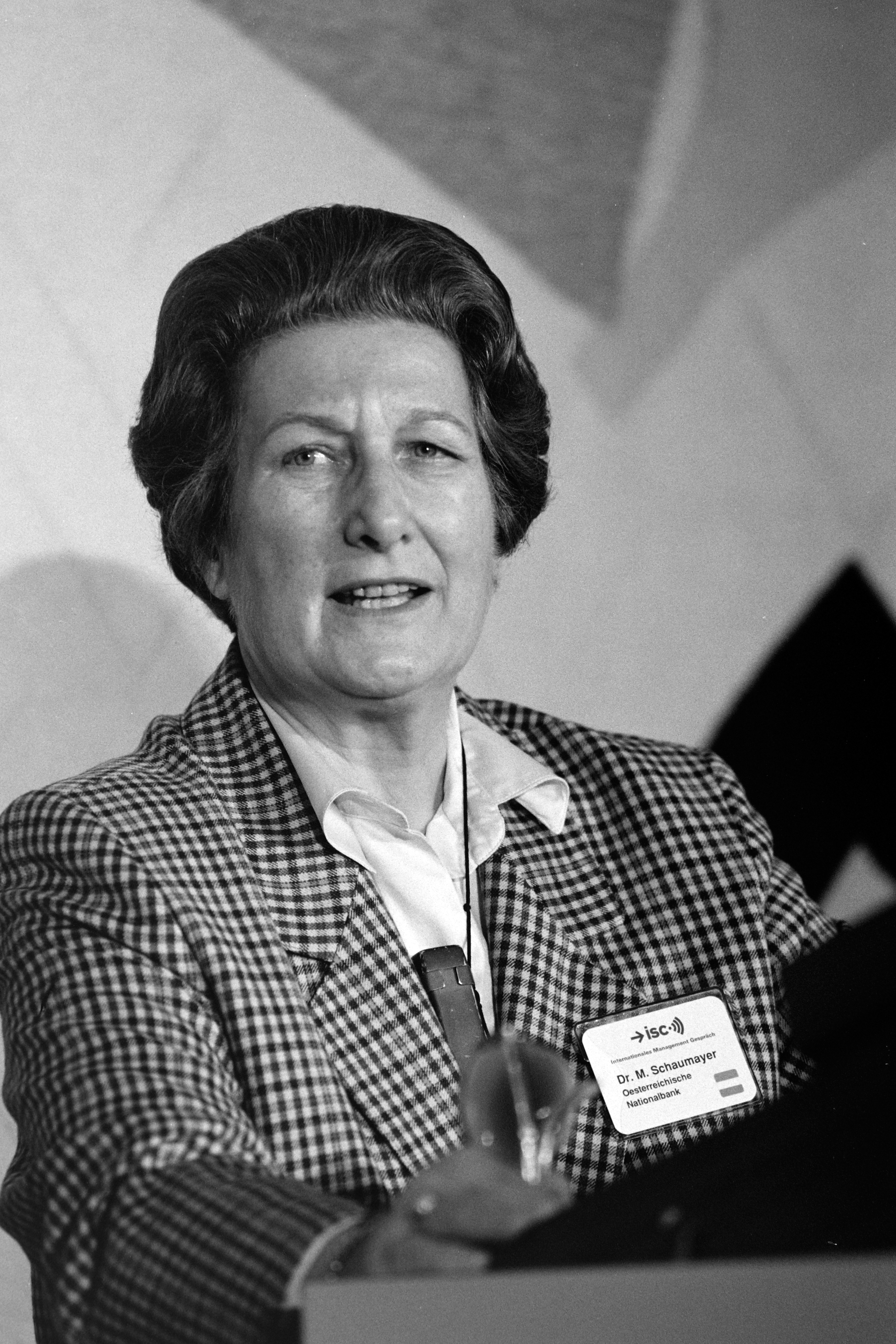
- Schaumayer in 1991
- Born: October 7, 1931; Graz
- Died: January 23, 2013 (aged 81); Vienna
- Education: Vienna University of Economics and Business
- Occupations: economist, politician, banker
- Organization: Austrian National Bank
- Political party: Austrian People's Party

Maria Schaumayer (born on October 7, 1931 – January 23, 2013) was an Austrian economist and politician, a member of the Austrian People's Party. From 1990 to 1995, she served as the Governor of the Austria’s central bank, the Oesterreichische Nationalbank (OeNB). In 1996, she was named an Honorary Citizen of Vienna, and in 2000, she was awarded the Golden Decoration of Honour for Services to the Republic of Austria.

== Early years and education ==
Maria Schaumayer was born on October 7, 1931, in Graz. She graduated from the Realgymnasium in Fürstenfeld in 1949 and then studied international trade and economics at the University of World Trade in Vienna and law at the University of Innsbruck, completing her studies in 1952. Schaumayer received her doctorate in 1954 in economics.

== Career ==
Initially, Schaumayer worked at the highly regarded Creditanstalt, where she became authorized signatory in 1961. She was also a member of the Viennese Association of Academics. From 1965 to 1969, Schaumayer was a member of the city council and regional government of Vienna, nominated by the Austrian People's Party (ÖVP), and responsible for public works. From 1969 to 1973, she was ÖVP faction speaker and councillor for construction and other technical matters.

After the 1973 elections, she left city government and in May 1974 became a Vorstand of Kommunalkredit AG, a specialist bank in Vienna, which specialized in public infrastructure projects. In 1978 she was re-elected to the Vienna city council. In 1982, Schaumayer was appointed CFO of OMV. In 1990, she was appointed Governor of the Oesterreichische Nationalbank (OeNB). On her 60th birthday in 1991, she founded the Dr. Maria Schaumayer Foundation, with the aim of actively supporting careers of women in business and science and promoting research into and improving the framework conditions for such careers. During her term in office, the salaries of the central bankers were also drastically cut. Her own salary was reduced from nine to six million schillings (440,000 euros) as a result of the reform. At the beginning of 1995 Schaumayer left the OeNB.

Starting in 2000 Schaumayer served as an honorary government representative responsible for the compensation of forced laborers under the Nazi regime. The key role she played in negotiating bilateral agreements between Austria and six European countries, the USA, as well as an agreement with a group of civil claimants represented by lawyer Ed Fagan brought her international recognition. In May 2006 Schaumayer became the first woman ever to be made an honorary member of the Austrian Academy of Sciences.

Maria Schaumayer died on 23 January 2013 and was buried at Döbling Cemetery on 2 February 2013 in an honor grave. In 2014, a square in Döbling was named Schaumayerplatz in her honor. It was renamed Maria-Schaumayer-Platz in 2016.

== Awards and honours ==
- Golden Decoration of Honour for Services to the City of Vienna, 1984
- Golden Decoration of Honour of Styria with Star, 1992
- Honorary Senator of the Vienna University of Economics and Business, 1992
- Silver Decoration with Ribbon for Services to the Republic of Austria, 1995
- Honorary Citizen of Vienna, 1996
- Golden Decoration of Honour for Services to the Republic of Austria, 2000
- Grand Decoration of Honour Pro Merito with Ribbon from the Vienna University of Economics and Business, 2001
- Grand Golden Decoration of Honour "Pro Merito" on Ribbon of the WU Vienna, 2002
- Honorary Member of the Austrian Academy of Sciences, 2006
- "Leopold Kunschak Prize", 2007 (as the first woman)
- Honorary Senator of the University of Innsbruck, 2008
