= Sir-Karl-Popper-Schule =

School in Vienna, Austria

Sir Karl Popper School
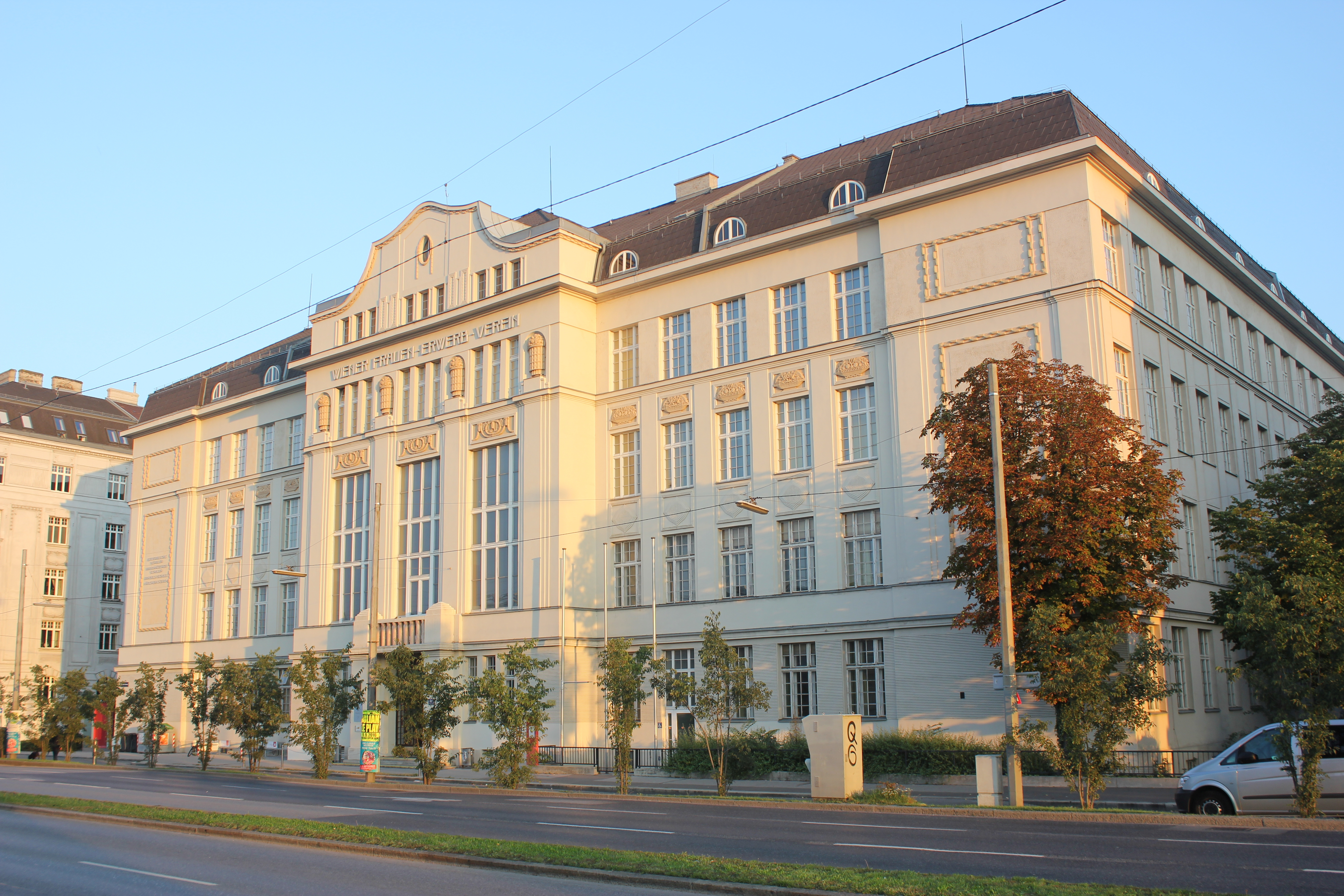
- building's entrance in 2009

Location
- Wiedner Gürtel 68; 1040 Vienna
- Coordinates: 48.184682°N 16.368706°E

Information
- School type: Public school for highly gifted students
- Established: 1998; 28 years ago
- Headmaster: Mag. Dr. Edwin Scheiber
- Grades: 9–12
- Gender: coed
- Enrollment: 188 (2019/'20)
- Class size: 24
- Website: www.popperschule.at/english

The Sir Karl Popper School is an experimental public school for highly gifted students in Vienna, Austria.

The school is a branch of Wiedner Gymnasium with federally granted experimental status for gifted education of students in grades 9-12. There are two classes with 24 students per year. Admittance is based on the results at a battery of IQ tests conducted by an external institution.

== History ==
The Sir Karl Popper Schule was founded in 1998 by Andreas Salcher, Walter Strobl and Bernhard Görg. The school was named after the famous British-Austrian Philosopher Sir Karl Popper.

== Admission ==
The school admits up to 48 students every year, who have been identified as being highly-gifted through a battery of internationally acknowledged intelligence tests such as the Advanced Progressive Matrices Test. The exams are administered by an external psychologist.

== Academics ==
Students at the school are not required to follow the fixed national curriculum but are allowed to choose their own timetable. Every student has to take the core subjects such as Mathematics, English and Science but is otherwise free to take elective courses according to their own interest.

Students take the Matura upon completion of their high school time. Several students matriculate to top-ranked international universities such as the Massachusetts Institute of Technology, Stanford University or ETH Zurich.

== Public discourse ==
The school has been called "Austria's best school" by the Kronen Zeitung.

The school continues to be the topic in the public discourse about differentiated education.
