= Walter Rothensteiner =

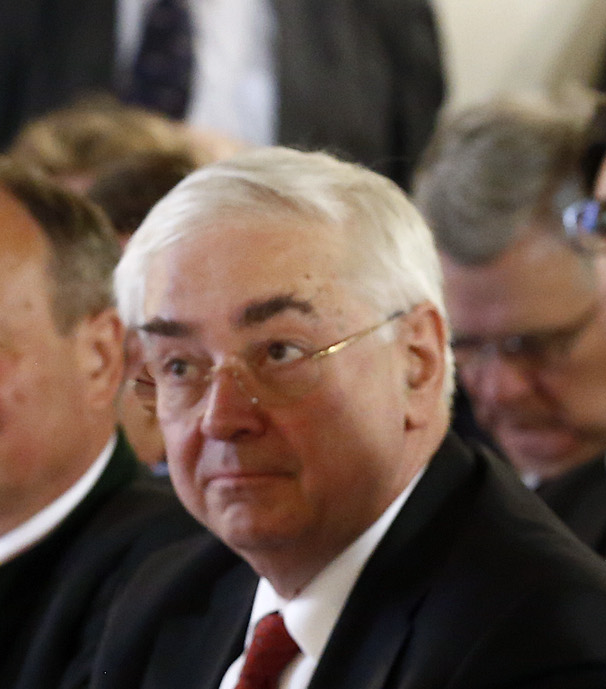
- Rothensteiner in 2015
- Born: Walter Rothensteiner; March 7, 1953 (age 72); St. Poelten
- Education: Vienna University of Economics
- Years active: 1975-date
- Employer: Raiffeisen Zentralbank
- Known for: Chairman of Raiffeisen Zentralbank

Walter Rothensteiner is the Chairman of the Raiffeisen Zentralbank.

Rothensteiner completed his studies at the Vienna University of Economics. He began his professional career in 1975 as a member of management at the Raiffeisen Zentralbank in Vienna, Austria. In 1991, he joined the board of the Agrana Holding AG. In addition to his role in Raiffeisen Zentralbank and AGRANA, Rothensteiner held a position on the board of Leipnik-Invest AG from 1987 to 1995.

In January 1995, Rothensteiner joined RZB as Deputy Chairman of the Board and became Chairman of the Board within five months. Since June 1997, Rothensteiner worked for the Austrian Economic Chamber in their credit division and represented the Republic of Singapore as an honorary consul of Austria.
