= Andreas Salcher =

Austrian politician (born 1960)

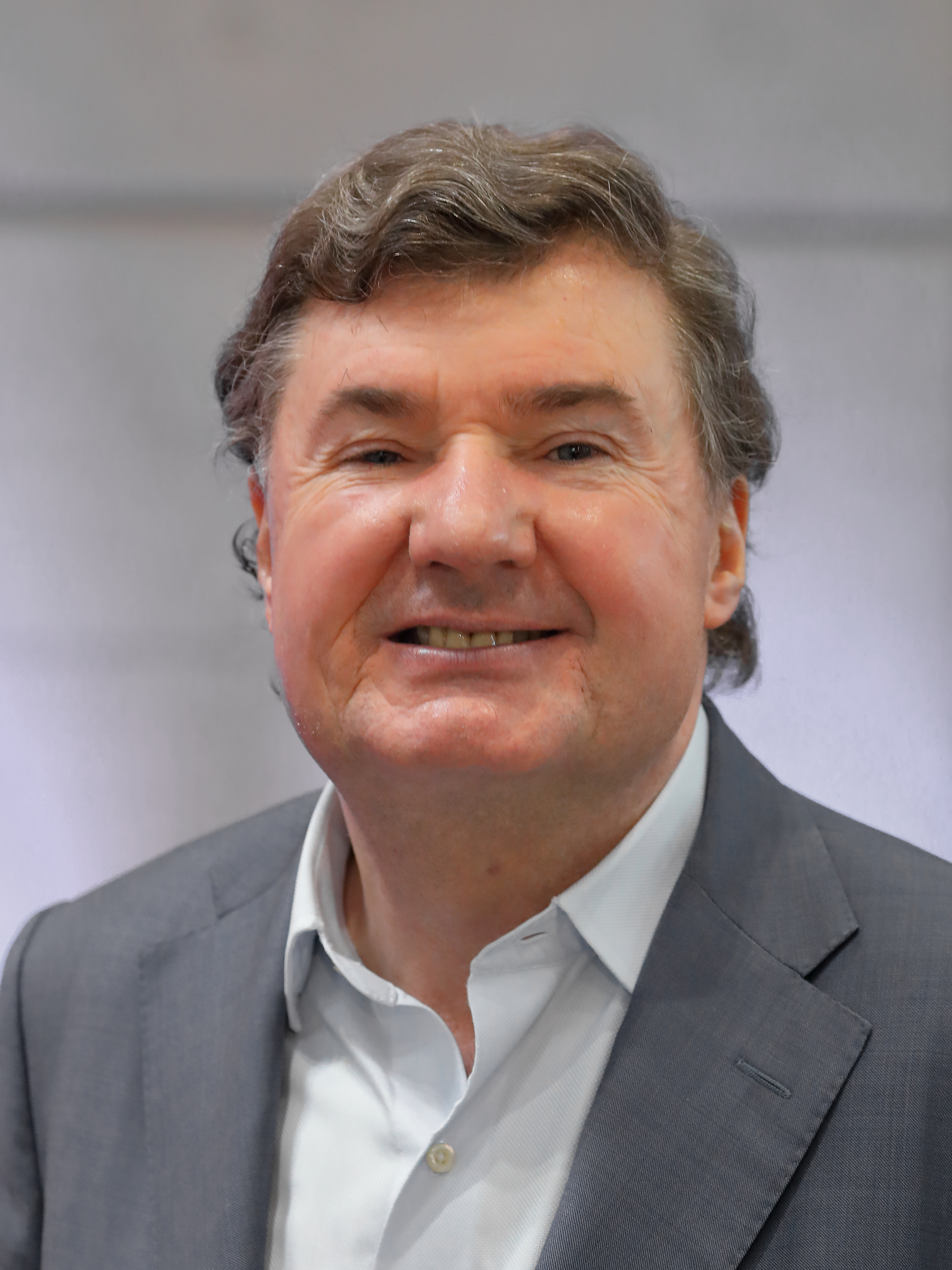
Andreas Salcher - Buchmesse Wien 2019

Andreas Salcher (born 18 December 1960 in Vienna) is a former Austrian politician of the Austrian People's Party (ÖVP), co-founder of the Sir-Karl-Popper-Schule, consultant and author.

== Biography ==
Andreas Salcher earned a PhD in business administration at the Vienna University of Economics and Business Administration in 1986 and completed the "Program for Senior Manager in Government" at Harvard University in 1989.

In 1985 Salcher started his political career as Chairman of the Youth Wing of the Vienna ÖVP. In 1987 he became the youngest member to be elected to the Vienna state parliament, whose member he remained over a period of 12 years. From 1992 to 1996 he was Vice Chairman of the Vienna ÖVP. During the term of Peter Marboe, City Councillor of Culture, he served as Chairman of the Vienna City Culture Committee. In 2005 he left the Vienna state parliament.

After a meeting with Karl Popper in London, Salcher founded Austria’s first school for the highly gifted in 1998. Since then he has been Executive Vice President of the Association of the "Sir Karl Popper School", which regards itself as a learning system that makes mistakes, admits them, reflects on them, and endeavors to correct them along the lines of trial and error.

In 2007 Salcher launched the global education project "The Curriculum Project – Creating the Schools of Tomorrow". It aims to reinvent the school of tomorrow together with the world's brightest minds, with its focus on the essential right of children the world over to develop their talents. His first book on this theme, The Talented Kid and His Enemy, was awarded the "Golden Book" by the Austrian Publishers' and Booksellers' Association in September 2008. My Last Hour is the title of his most recent book. In 2009 his work The Talented Kid and His Enemy won him the Austrian literary award "Favorite Book 2009" and the title "Writer of the Year". The Austrian Public Relations Association presented Salcher with the award "Communicator of the Year".

All subsequent books, The Wounded Man, My Last Hour and I didn't know, were also No. 1 bestsellers, with the first two each exceeding sales numbers above 50,000 in Austria and therefore being awarded with the "Platinum Book" by the Austrian Publishers' and Booksellers' Association in May 2012. In September 2012, Salcher brought out his fifth book No Moore School - More and More Joy.

== Selected publications ==
- Nie mehr Schule - Immer mehr Freude. Ecowin, Salzburg 2012, ISBN 978-3-7110-0032-3.
- Ich habe es nicht gewusst. Ecowin, Salzburg 2012, ISBN 978-3-7110-0021-7.
- Meine letzte Stunde. Ecowin, Salzburg 2010, ISBN 978-3-902404-96-1
- Der verletzte Mensch. Ecowin, Salzburg 2009, ISBN 978-3-902404-69-5
- Der talentierte Schüler und seine Feinde. Ecowin, Salzburg 2008, ISBN 978-3-902404-55-8
- Die Sir-Karl-Popper-Schule: Ein Projekt zur Förderung von Hochbegabten im internationalen Vergleich. In: Österreichisches Jahrbuch der Politik. Verlag für Geschichte und Politik, Vienna 1994, ISBN 3-7028-0335-1
