= Marcegaglia =

Italian corporation

- Type: Holding
- Industry: Steel
- Founded: 1959 (67 years ago) in Gazoldo degli Ippoliti
- Founder: Steno Marcegaglia
- Headquarters: Gazoldo degli Ippoliti, Mantua, Lombardy, Italy
- Key people: Antonio Marcegaglia (Chairman and CEO Marcegaglia Steel); Emma Marcegaglia (Chairman and CEO Marcegaglia Holding)
- Products: Ingots; slabs; billets; blooms; wire rods; drawn wires; coils; strips; sheets; pre-painted products; welded tubes; heavy plates; bars; handles; condensers and evaporators for household appliances; refrigeration coils; scaffolding; insulated panels; crash barriers
- Revenue: 7.5 billion (2023) (2023)
- Number of employees: 7,800
- Website: www.marcegaglia.com

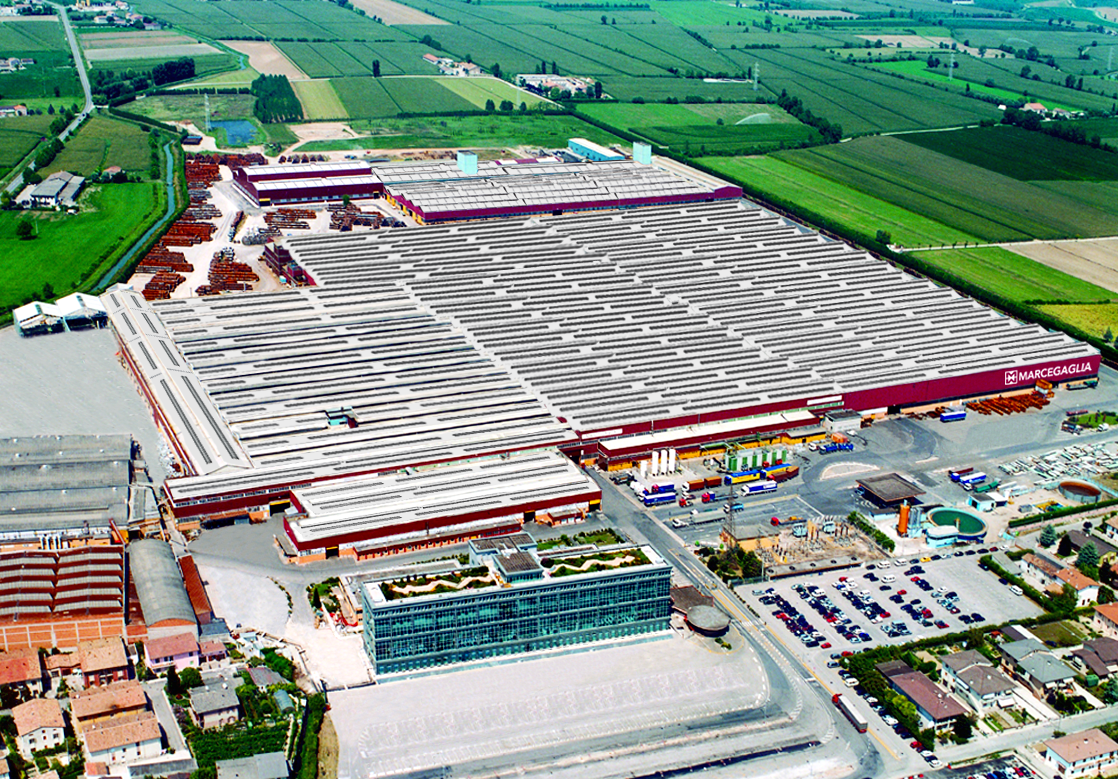
Marcegaglia HQ

Marcegaglia (Italian pronunciation: [martʃeˈɡaʎʎa]) is an Italian corporation founded in 1959 by Steno Marcegaglia, operating in the European and worldwide steel market.

== History ==
=== Origins and Growth, in Italy and in the World ===
The story of the Marcegaglia Group began in 1959 in Italy, when Steno Marcegaglia, not quite thirty, together with a partner, through Marcegaglia-Caraffini of Gazoldo degli Ippoliti (Mantua), took over an artisan company producing irrigation pipes and metal guides for rolling shutters.

Four years later, in Contino di Volta Mantovana, a company named IPAS was established to manufacture round and flat drawn products with some ten employees. Meanwhile, in the Gazoldo degli Ippoliti factory, where around 30 employees were already working on the production of open profiles, the first tubes from cold-rolled strip were beginning to be manufactured.

From 1963 onwards the production activities of these small companies were enhanced and extended with timely, constant investments. And in 1969 a new rolling mill was purchased for the manufacture of cold-rolled strip.

In 1974 the Gazoldo degli Ippoliti establishment had over 250,000 square metres of industrial sheds. The production range was diversified and complemented with the addition of tubes from hot-rolled strip.

In 1978 the Marcegaglia Group drove its industrial activities further forward through a programme of acquisition of depressed companies, which were then reorganised and made competitive in the various sectors in which they were operating.

In 1982, when the overall number of employees had already reached 640, the second largest establishment in the group was founded in Casalmaggiore, equipped with technologically advanced installations made by "Oto Mills" of Boretto (Reggio Emilia). This company, acquired in partnership with other partners in 1979, would have a key role in the technical innovation of all the production plants of the Group.

In 1983, three new companies were acquired: Lombarda Tubi of Lomagna (Lecco), Saom of Boltiere (Bergamo) and Trisider of Tezze (Vicenza). By 1983 the overall “made in Marcegaglia” turnover had risen to the equivalent of 175 million euros and the workforce exceeded 860 employees. The group of companies continued to be personally overseen by Steno Marcegaglia, together with his wife Palmira Bazzani, joined subsequently by their son and daughter Antonio and Emma. In 1984, an internal restructuring plan redefined the character of the group. Former Metallurgica Marcegaglia, former Ipas and former Tubi Acciaio were merged in the newly established Marcegaglia Spa. Lombarda Tubi incorporated the former Saom, whilst Trisider and Oto Mills maintained their corporate autonomy in the distribution and engineering sector.

In 1985, the Marcegaglia Group continued to develop its industrial activities with the acquisition of three major companies in the Maraldi group: Maraldi of Ravenna, Forlisider of Forlimpopoli (Forlì) and Salpa of Cervignano del Friuli (Udine), specialising in the production of water, gas and methane pipes, which would then be restructured and transformed into the new Marcegaglia plants in Forlì, Cervignano and Ravenna.

In 1985, after the acquisition of Cct of Santo Stefano Ticino (Milan), Profilnastro of Dusino San Michele (Asti) – at the time under temporary receivership – producer of tubes from hot-rolled strip, was also acquired. The management of the companies in operation as a result of the restructuring, the monitoring of the involvement of the group in non-metal industrial companies and the management of a significant share and bond portfolio, made it necessary in 1987 to form a new company, Fingem Spa, which has become one of the largest financial operators in the national and European markets.

In 1987 Antonio Marcegaglia joined the company after graduating in business studies from Milan's Luigi Bocconi University.

In 1988, the Island of Albarella was purchased from Credit Suisse. This tourism complex has become an established resort on the Adriatic Sea.

Led by Antonio Marcegaglia, the diversification of the group was then extended with the establishment of Bioindustrie Mantovane and the acquisition of Oskar of Osteria Grande (Bologna), Nuova Omec, Ennepi of Lugo di Romagna (Ravenna) and Imat of Fontanafredda (Pordenone) in 1988 and of CCT of Gallarate (Varese) and Elet. Ca of Capalle (Florence) in 1989, as well as the foundation in 1989 of Marcegaglia Impianti of Saronno (Varese). In the same year, Marcegaglia acquired holdings in Fergallo of Motteggiana (Mantua), SIM of Sant'Atto (Teramo) and Elletre of Montebello Vicentino (Vicenza). In 1991 the Group acquired Resco Tubi of Cusago (Milan) and OMF of Fiume Veneto (Pordenone). In 1994 it acquired Brollo Profilati of Desio (Milan), later moved to the “former Breda” area just outside Milan, on site totalling 80 thousand square metres purchased in 1996, and then in 1995 ETA Euro Tubi Acciaio of Milan, followed by a stake in Allu's of Sesto al Reghena (Pordenone).

The new business and production constellation enabled the group to have a presence also in the sectors of metal household items, electrostatic paint for metals and metal components for the electrical appliance industry. Meanwhile, its metallurgical sector grew with the production of fine stainless steel tubes and cold-rolled profiles.

In 1996, the Euro Energy Group was also established in order to create plants for the production of energy from renewable sources. In January 1997 Nuova Forsidera Spa, specialising in steel cold rolling and galvanising processes, was acquired with its plants in Corsico (Milan) and Albignasego (Padua).

The group's energy division was expanded in 1997 under the guidance of Antonio Marcegaglia with the establishment of Green Power, for the development of strategies and systems for energy generation through the gasification of waste and biomass. Further expansion came in 1998, with the design and construction of industrial and power boilers.

In that same year came the acquisition of Astra of Mezzolara, Budrio (Bologna) and the Siderplating establishment was also acquired, under the name of Marcegaglia San Giorgio of Nogaro (Udine), producing rolling mill plates.

Antonio Marcegaglia's corporate development programme continued in 1999 with the acquisition of Morteo Nord of Pozzolo Formigaro (Alessandria), and Ponteggi Dalmine of Milan, Graffignana (Lodi) and Potenza.

This was followed in 2001 by the acquisition, in the tourism sector, of the holiday resort of Pugnochiuso, situated on the Gargano promontory in Puglia.

In December 2001, following an investment of over 500 million euros over very few years, the large new establishment in Ravenna was opened: the second largest iron and steel centre in Italy. And in 2002, in the former Belleli area in Taranto, its second largest production plant in the South, after the one in Potenza, entered into operation

In 2003, the sector of products for the household electrical appliance industry expanded further with the acquisition of BVB of San Lorenzo in Campo (Pesaro). While in 2004 the group took a fundamental step in the development of its activities in the tourism sector by acquiring, with Banca Intesa and the Ifil group, 49% of Sviluppo Italia Turismo

In 2007 Antonio Marcegaglia acquired the stake in Gabetti Property Solutions and upgraded the Ravenna plant with a further investment of 300 million euros. The Group continued its expansion in the energy sector where, with its subsidiary Arendi, began production of photovoltaic panels. Likewise, its presence in tourism grew further with the acquisition of the management of Forte Village of Santa Margherita di Pula, in Sardinia, the largest hotel complex in Italy and Europe. This was followed soon after by the “Le Tonnare” holiday resort in Stintino, in the province of Sassari. In 2007 the production plant at Boltiere (Bergamo) was also enlarged. In 2008 the Group acquired the holiday location at Castel Monastero di Castelnuovo Berardenga (Siena) and the "Former Arsenale" property complex at La Maddalena (Sassari).

=== Internationalisation of the Group ===
In 1989, Antonio Marcegaglia launched the Marcegaglia Group's internationalisation policy which has strengthened its direct presence in the international markets.

Marcegaglia Deutschland of Düsseldorf was established in 1989 for the distribution of the Group's own products on the German market and in Scandinavia. United Stainless Steel was also created in the UK near London, followed by Marcegaglia U.K., for the production of welded tubes from hot and cold rolled strip, and then by Marcegaglia UK at Dudley, West Midlands.

In 1991 Antonio Marcegaglia launched the project which would see the group enter into the transatlantic markets. In the second half of the year The New Bishop Tube of Philadelphia was acquired in the US, and, in February 1992, Damascus of Greenville. Two major production units which then led to the creation of Damascus-Bishop Tube Company, specialising in the production of stainless steel.

In 1993 Antonio Marcegaglia acquired the Belgian Cotubel group, a distributor of stainless steel products and tubes in France and Benelux, and founded the trading company Central Bright Steel for the distribution of welded tubes in the UK; it also began production of these same products near Birmingham in 1997.

In the summer of 1998, a large industrial area in Munhall, near Pittsburgh, was acquired to accommodate the new Marcegaglia USA, which would also incorporate the Damascus-Bishop Tube Company.

During the same period, two other companies were formed in the United States, as subsidiaries of the parent companies in Italy: Oskar Usa in Birmingham (Alabama) and Oto Mills Usa in Wheaton (Illinois).

In 1999 Antonio Marcegaglia's efforts led to the incorporation of Marcegaglia Iberica, Marcegaglia Ireland, Marcegaglia France, Marcegaglia Austria and Marcegaglia do Brasil, the latter tripling its turnover by 2005, extending its plant and taking the number of its employees to 1000. Meanwhile, in Bremen, in joint venture with the Arbed Group, the first Marcegaglia company to produce quality steel was formed.

In 2000, the Group acquired Earcanal of Leioa, Spain. Following the joint venture with Arbed, in 2004 the Marcegaglia Group signed an agreement with the Corus group for the 10-year co-management of its British steelworks on Teesside, guaranteeing the supply at cost price of one million tonnes per year of slabs for the production of coils and sheets. Oto Mills do Brasil was founded in San Paolo in the same year.

In 2005 the Group proceeded with the expansion of Marcegaglia do Brasil, and in June Antonio Marcegaglia opened its fourth overseas production plant in Praszka (Poland), to manufacture tubes for refrigeration, panels and corrugated steel sheets. One year later, 20 kilometres away, the plant at Kluczbork was added, for the production of tubes and drawn products. Marcegaglia established Marcegaglia Gulf at Doha, Qatar in 2007. The expansion of its industrial activities continued in 2008 with its entry into China, where, in Yangzhou, 270 km north-west of Shanghai, it created its first Asian plant for the production of stainless steel tubes and high-precision carbon steel, with the establishment of Marcegaglia Romania at Cluj, and with the start of work on the new production plant at Vladimir, Russia.

In January 2023, the Group acquired an electric arc furnace steel mill for stainless steels in Sheffield, United Kingdom. The operation also included a wire rod rolling mill and a bar production plant, both in Sheffield; a bar production plant in Richburg (United States); and a hot rolling mill for wire rods and a drawn wire production plant in Fagersta (Sweden).

In 2024, Marcegaglia completes its steel production capacity with the Fos-sur-Mer facility in France, which is capable of meeting approximately 30% of the Group's steel requirements.

=== Investments and technology ===
The Marcegaglia Group has invested a lot of resources in applied research through its subsidiary Oto Mills, the engineering company created for this specific purpose, and Marcegaglia Impianti, the engineering division specialising in the construction of turnkey iron and steel installations (for which it not only supplies the necessary production machinery, but also all the technological experience already "proven" in the group's establishments), and is now exporting its own know-how also to countries in Eastern Europe, in the Far East and to developing countries.

One example of the technology installed in the Marcegaglia Group's production plants is the stainless steel pickling plant and the five-year “Ravenna 2000” project, which resulted in the Ravenna plant becoming the second largest iron and steel centre in Italy, with over 4 million tonnes of semi-finished materials per year, thanks to its new hot galvanisation, coating, cold rolling, and pickling installations, and to its service centre.

With the completion of the Ravenna iron and steel plant, opened in December 2001, and of other smaller projects now in operation, the Marcegaglia group is now processing around 6.5 million tonnes of steel per year of finished products.

=== Employment within the Group ===
The average age of the employees within the group, which now has 7,800 employees located in over 50 production, administrative and commercial departments, is around 30 years.

The company makes various claims concerning its loyalty to its workforce.

== Operations ==
=== The Marcegaglia Group today ===
The group has operations worldwide with 7,800 employees, 60 sales offices, 210 representations and 36 manufacturing plants covering 6 million square metres, where 5,500 kilometres of carbon and stainless steel products are manufactured every day, serving more than 15,000 customers. Activities in the steel sector and other businesses generated over 7.5 billion euro turnover in 2023.

=== Iron and steel operations ===
In its 36 production establishments in Italy and overseas (Europe, USA, South America, Asia, Africa), it processes around 6.5 million tonnes of steel every year and produces daily almost 5,500 kilometres of ingots, slabs, billets, blooms, wire rods, drawn wires, coils, strips, sheets, pre-painted products, welded tubes, heavy plates, bars, handles, condensers and evaporators for household appliances, refrigeration coils, scaffolding, insulated panels, crash barriers, for use in the manufacture of automobiles, electrical appliances, heat exchangers, furniture and shelving; in the construction of buildings and large infrastructures; in metal structural work; in the papermaking industry, food industry, etc.

=== Diversified operations ===
The Marcegaglia Group also has various subsidiary companies in a wide range of other industrial and non-industrial sectors, such as engineering, with the design and construction of metallurgical installations and establishments; metal structural work and electronic monitoring systems; the energy industry, with the design and construction of electrical power plants using biomass and photovoltaic panels; the environmental sector, supplying services for safety and environmental protection to businesses and individuals; metal products, with the manufacture of brooms, brushes and shovels for household cleaning; agriculture and livestock farming, with the management of agricultural estates and rearing facilities; and tourism and property (Pugnochiuso, Albarella and Castel Monastero).

=== The production and commercial divisions ===
Iron and steel and other activities of the Marcegaglia Group are divided into seven production and commercial divisions with over 210 representing companies in Italy and overseas: Marcegaglia Steel, Marcegaglia Building, Marcegaglia Home Products, Marcegaglia Engineering, Marcegaglia Energy, Marcegaglia Tourism and Marcegaglia Services.

=== The Marcegaglia family ===
The Marcegaglia group developed as and is still a family business, in terms of both its share ownership and the composition of the Board of Directors, where Steno Marcegaglia, his wife Palmira and their children Antonio and Emma are all members.

=== Legal proceedings ===
In 2008 Marcegaglia Spa reached a plea-bargaining settlement involving the payment of a fine of 250 thousand euro plus confiscation of 250 thousand euro for a bribe of 1 million 158 thousand euro paid to Lorenzo Marzocchi of EniPower in 2003. Its subsidiary joint-stock company N.e./C.c.t. spa paid a fine of 500 thousand euro, plus confiscation of 5 million 250 thousand euro.

At present, further to a report from the Swiss authorities, investigations are underway to verify the use and legality of several numbered foreign bank accounts.

== Bibliography ==
- M.S. Sacchi, Gruppo Marcegaglia a tutta industria, Corriere Economia, 28-5-2007
- GM News (foglio informativo del gruppo), luglio 1999
- GM News, dicembre 1999
- Marcegaglia, Company profile 2024
- Marcegaglia, Corporate profile 2007
- Steno Marcegaglia, Il signore dell’acciaio - l’avventura umana e imprenditoriale di Steno Marcegaglia
