= Ilona Graenitz =

Austrian politician (1943–2022)

Ilona Graenitz MEP MP
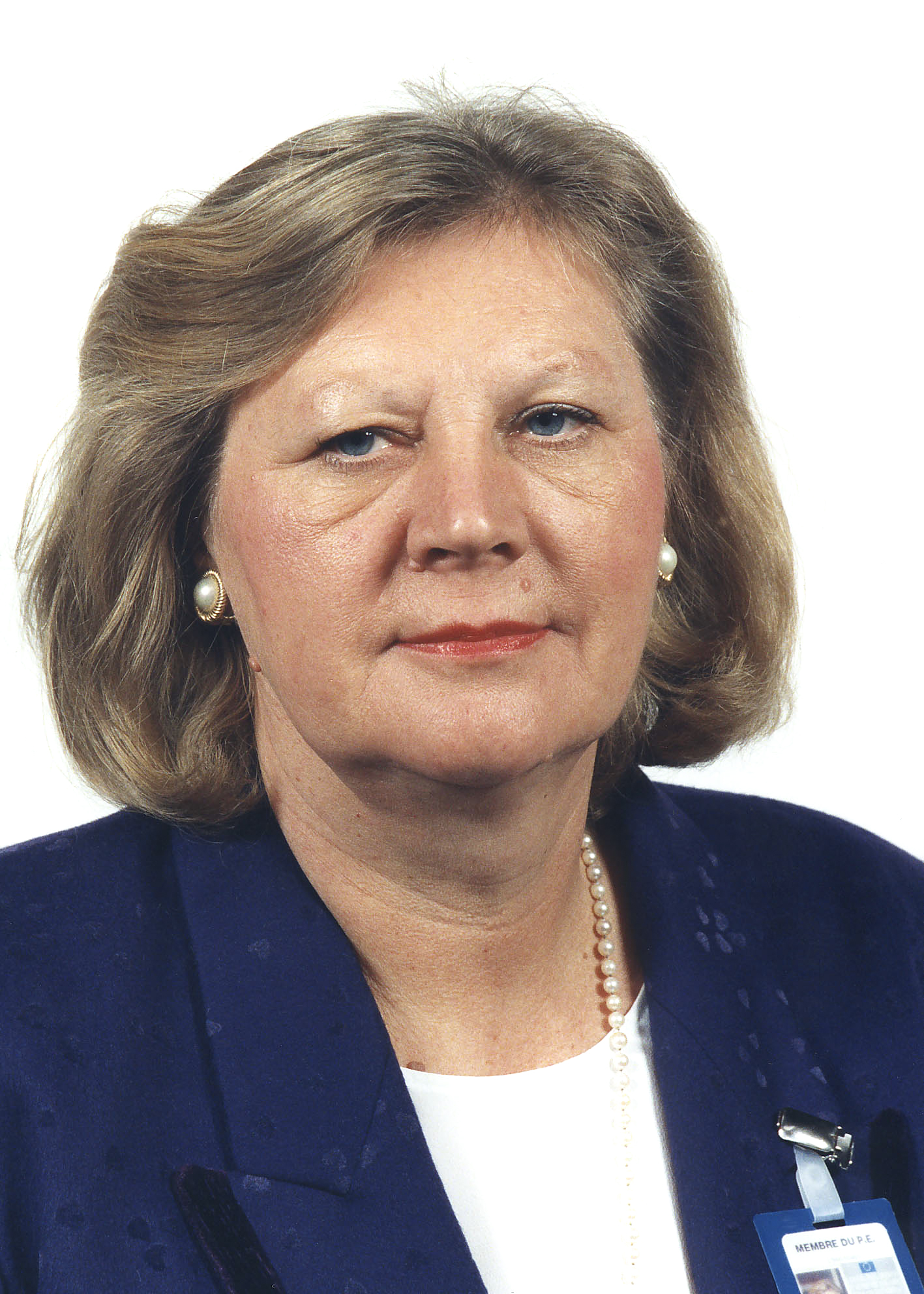

Member of the European Parliament for Austria
- In office 1 January 1995 – 20 July 1999

Member of the National Council
- In office 17 December 1986 – 19 September 1995
- Constituency: Upper Austria

Member of the Linz Municipal Council
- In office 5 November 1979 – 17 December 1986

Personal details
- Born: 15 March 1943 Vienna, Nazi Germany
- Died: 17 July 2022 (aged 79) Vienna, Austria
- Resting place: Grinzing Cemetery
- Party: Social Democratic Party of Austria
- Other political affiliations: Party of European Socialists
- Education: University of World Trade (Dipl.-Kfm.)

Ilona Graenitz (15 March 1943 – 17 July 2022) was an Austrian politician who served in the National Council of Austria and the European Parliament as a member of the Social Democratic Party of Austria.

== Biography ==
Graenitz was born on 15 March 1943 in Vienna, then part of Nazi Germany. Her parents worked as clerks. Graenitz graduated from the University of World Trade in 1965 with a Dipl.-Kfm degree in business administration. In 1969, Graenitz received qualifications to become a language teacher. She then moved to the city of Linz, where she worked in the export department of Chemie Linz AG, a chemical company, from 1966 to 1968. Graenitz later worked in banking and insurance. She also taught at Linz Polytechnic School from 1968 until 1972.

In 1979, Graenitz, a member of the Social Democratic Party of Austria (SPÖ), was elected to the Linz Municipal Council, serving until 1986, when she was elected to the National Council, the lower house of the Austrian Parliament. Graenitz, who represented Upper Austria, served in the National Council until 1995. She was also the secretary of the National Council from 1990 to 1995. From 1991 until 1994, Graenitz was part of the Austrian delegation to the Parliamentary Assembly of the Council of Europe. In 1995, Graenitz was elected to the European Parliament, representing the Austria constituency as a member of the Party of European Socialists. While in the European Parliament, she served as a rapporteur. Graenitz resigned from the European Parliament in 1999.

During her career, Graenitz also served as a party functionary, serving as the SPÖ director for the district of Linz and for the state of Upper Austria. In the 2010s, Graenitz served as the chair of various United Nations NGO committees, as part of the UN Conference of NGOs.

Graenitz died on 17 July 2022 at the age of 79 in Vienna. She is buried in the Grinzing Cemetery.

== Awards ==
- Grand Decoration of Honour in Gold for Services to the Republic of Austria
