= Emma Marcegaglia =

Italian entrepreneur (born 1965)

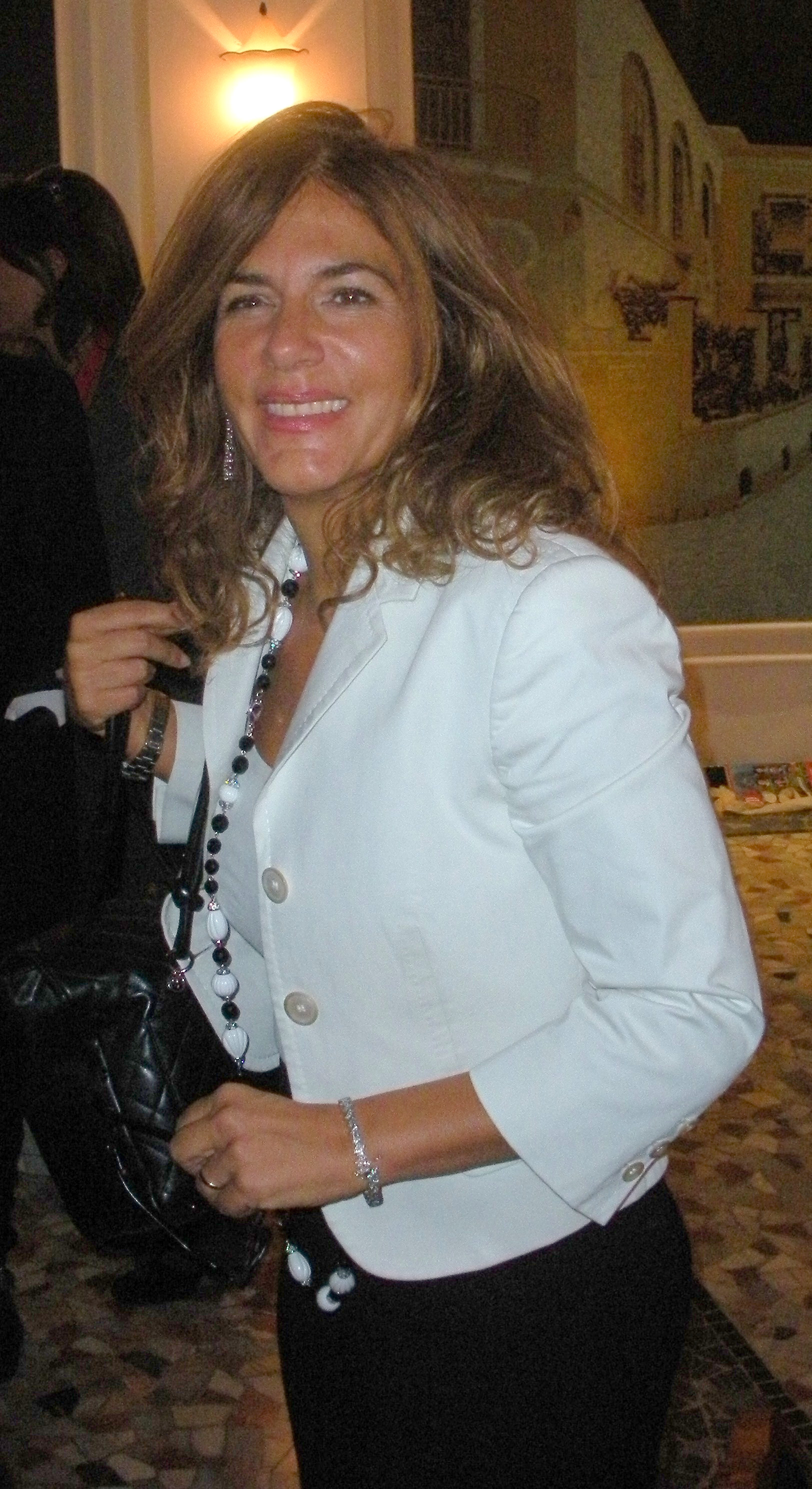
- Born: 24 December 1965 (age 60)

Emma Marcegaglia (born 24 December 1965) is an Italian entrepreneur. She was president of Confindustria from 2008 to 2012, and president of the Libera Università Internazionale degli Studi Sociali Guido Carli from 2010 to 2019. From 2014 to 2020, she was president of Eni.

== Biography ==
Born in Mantua, she graduated from the Bocconi University in 1989, and studied at New York University.

From 2004 to 2008, she was a vice president of Confindustria. She was the Italian representative for energy, competitiveness and environment of the European Commission. From 2008 to 2012 she was president of Confindustria. From 2013 to 2018, she was president of Confederation of European Business. She was a member of the board of Banco Popolare. She was also chairman of the Aretè Onlus Foundation.
