= Claus Raidl =

Austrian banker (1942–2024)

Claus Raidl (6 November 1942 – 10 December 2024) was an Austrian banker. He was president of the Austrian National Bank from 2008 to 2018. Raidl died on 10 December 2024, at the age of 82.

In 2009, Raidl was named Stainless & Special Steel Executive of the Year at the International Stainless & Special Steel Summit in Düsseldorf, Germany, in recognition of his contributions to the stainless and special steel industry.
