= Austrian National Bank =

Central Bank of Austria

Coordinates: 48°12′58″N 16°21′15″E

Oesterreichische Nationalbank

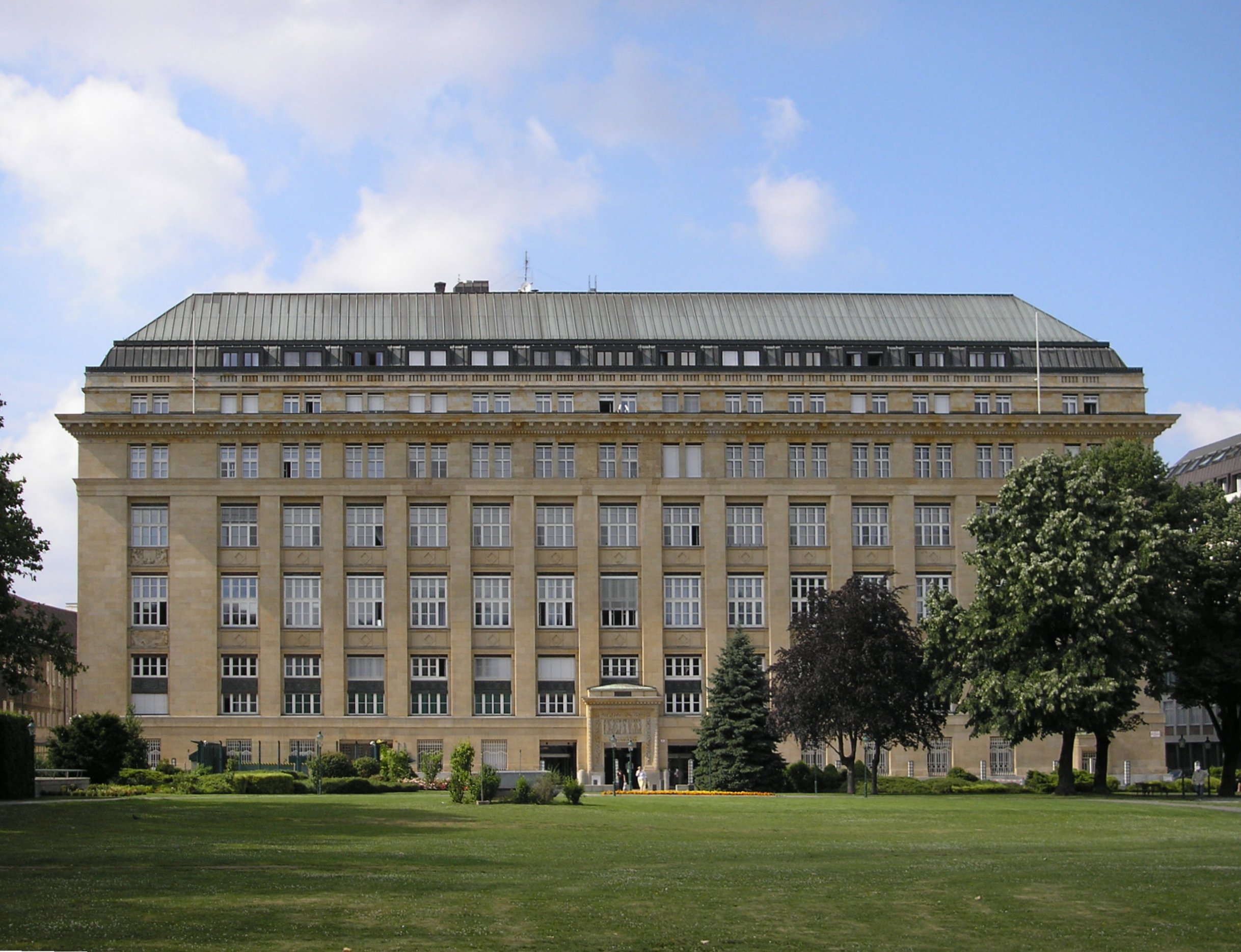
- Central bank of: Austria
- Headquarters: Vienna
- Established: 1 January 1923; 103 years ago
- Ownership: 100% state ownership
- Governor: Martin Kocher
- Currency: Euro; EUR (ISO 4217)
- Reserves: 9 620 million USD
- Preceded by: Austro-Hungarian Bank
- Succeeded by: European Central Bank (1999)^{1}
- Website: oenb.at/en/
- ^{1} The Oesterreichische Nationalbank still exists but many functions have been taken over by the ECB.

The Oesterreichische Nationalbank (Austrian German pronunciation: [ˈøːstɐraɪçɪʃə natsi̯oˈnaːlˌbaŋk], lit. 'Austrian Central Bank', abbr. OeNB) is the national central bank for Austria within the Eurosystem.

The bank doesn't use the name Austrian National Bank in English, it uses its German name Oesterreichische Nationalbank in its English communications. The Austrian National Bank started operations on 1 January 1923 as central bank of the newly formed First Austrian Republic, under the economic assistance provided to Austria by the Economic and Financial Organization of the League of Nations. It thus succeeded the Austro-Hungarian Bank on Austrian territory, with its name recalling that of the Austro-Hungarian Bank's predecessor entity founded in 1816. It was liquidated following the Anschluss in March 1938, and re-established in July 1945. From 1923 to 1938 and again from 1945 to 1998, it issued the Austrian schilling.

It is an Aktiengesellschaft governed by special legislative provision, fully owned by the Austrian federal government since May 2010 with shareholder rights exercised by the Minister of Finance. Before 2010, half of the capital was in the hands of employer and employee organizations as well as banks and insurance corporations.

The Austrian National Bank is not itself a financial supervisory authority but participates in European banking supervision as a member of the Supervisory Board of the European Central Bank, alongside the Financial Market Authority. It is also a member of the European Systemic Risk Board (ESRB).

== History ==
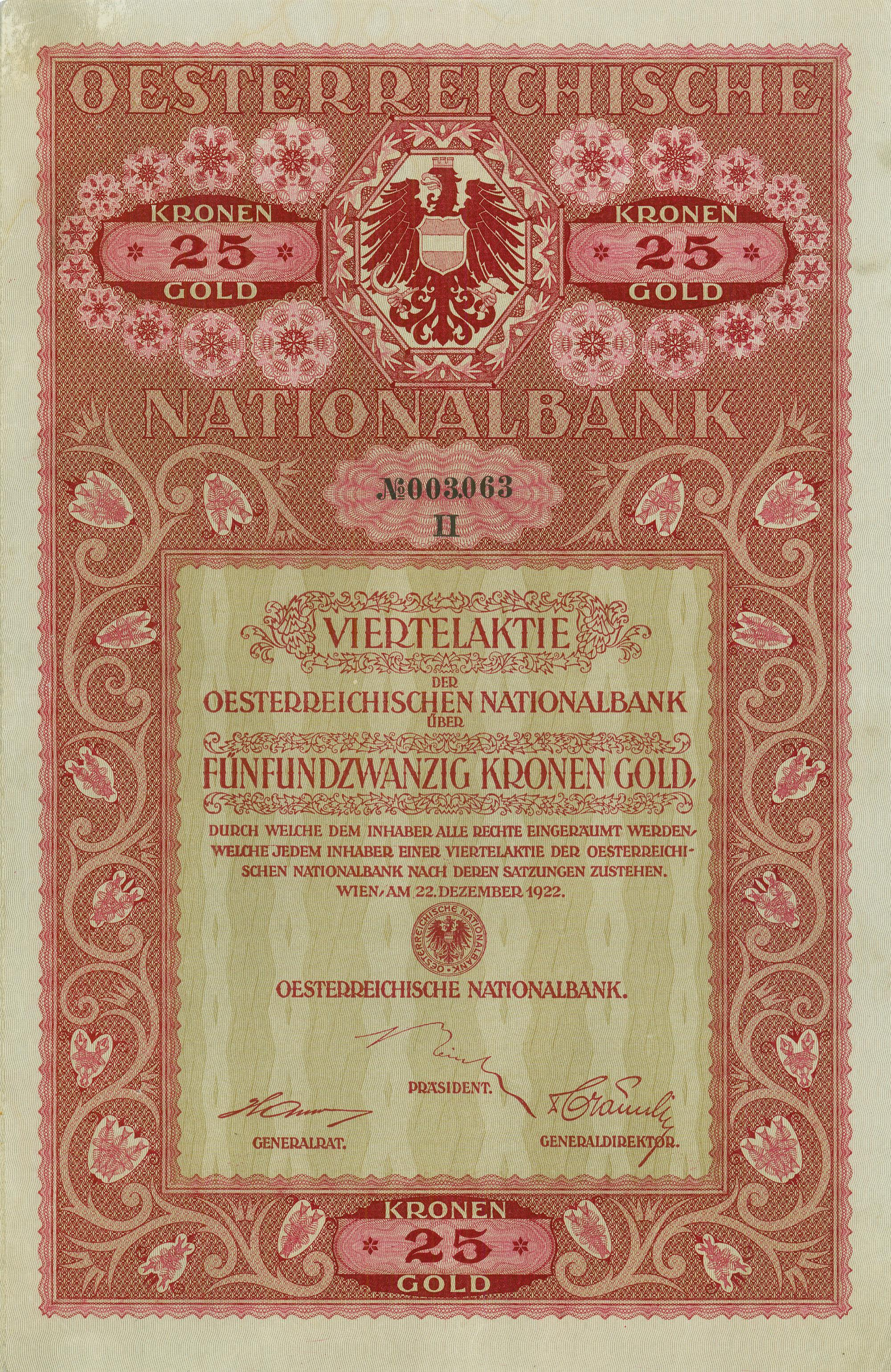
A quarter of a founder's share of the Oesterreichische Nationalbank, issued 22. December 1922

The Oesterreichische Nationalbank was established under the conditions of the stabilization loan coordinated by the Economic and Financial Organization of the League of Nations in 1922–23. The bank's statutes were drafted by the League's Financial Committee and enacted in Austrian legislation on 14 November 1922. The new institution started operations on 1 January 1923. It took over the former Austrian-territory branches and operations of the Austro-Hungarian Bank, whose liquidation had been implemented in accordance with the Treaty of Saint-Germain-en-Laye signed on 10 September 1919, and whose Governing Council last met on 15 December 1922.

Following the banking crisis of 1931, Austrian National Bank President Viktor Kienböck oversaw an orthodox economic policy paradigm in which he rigorously defended the currency in the face of growing overvaluation. This contributed to a substantial contraction in Austrian GDP.

Following the Anschluss in 1938, the Austrian National Bank's was liquidated, and its shareholders were forced to accept German government bonds in exchange for their shares. Most of its assets and liabilities, including gold reserves, were taken over by the Reichsbank; Karl Blessing, by then a junior Reichsbank official and future President of the Deutsche Bundesbank, directed the restructuring. The former Austrian National Bank became the Reichsbank's Vienna branch, and the Reichsmark became Austria's currency by German decree of 17 March 1938. The former National Bank's gold holdings and foreign currency reserves were moved to Berlin.

The Oesterreichische Nationalbank was re-established by the Central Bank Transition Act of 3 July 1945 of the Second Austrian Republic. The Austrian schilling came back to replace the Reichsmark on 21 December 1945. Much of the head office building served as headquarters of the American occupation forces in Austria from 1945 to 1951.

== Tasks and composition ==
The main tasks of the OeNB center on contributing to a stability-oriented monetary policy within the Eurozone, safeguarding financial stability in Austria and supplying the general public and the business community in Austria with high-quality, i.e. counterfeit-proof, cash. In addition, the OeNB manages reserve assets, i.e. gold and foreign exchange holdings, with a view to backing the euro in times of crisis, draws up economic analyses, compiles statistical data, is active in international organizations and is responsible for payment systems oversight. Furthermore, the OeNB operates a payment system for the euro, promotes knowledge and understanding among the general public and decision makers owing to its comprehensive communication policy, and supports research in Austria.

Governing Board
Name	Function
Martin Kocher	Governor
Edeltraud Stiftinger	Vice Governor
Josef Meichenitsch	Executive Director
Thomas Steiner	Executive Director

== Presidents/Governors ==
Name	Term
Richard Reisch	1922–1932
Viktor Kienböck	1932–1938
Eugen Kaniak	1945
Hans Rizzi	1945–1952
Eugen Margarétha	1952–1960
Reinhard Kamitz	1960–1967
Wolfgang Schmitz	1968–1973
Hans Kloss	1973–1978
Stephan Koren	1978–1988
Hellmuth Klauhs	1988–1990
Maria Schaumayer	1990–1995
Klaus Liebscher	President 1995–1998, Governor from 1998 to September 2008
Adolf Wala	Director 1988–1998, President 1998–2003
Herbert Schimetschek	President 2003–2008
Claus Raidl	President September 2008 – August 2018
Ewald Nowotny	Governor September 2008 – August 2019
Harald Mahrer	President since 1 September 2018
Robert Holzmann	Governor from 1 September 2019 – August 2025
Martin Kocher	Governor since 1 September 2025

== See also ==
- Economy of Austria
- Austrian schilling
- List of central banks
- List of banks in Austria
