= Atomlos durch die Macht =

- Nuclear-free through power
- Directed by: Markus Kaiser-Mühlecker
- Screenplay by: Markus Kaiser-Mühlecker; Gabi Schweiger
- Produced by: KM-Film (Kaiser-Mühlecker)
- Music by: Biermösl Blosn, ..
- Release date: 2019 (Austria)
- Running time: 74 minutes
- Country: Austria
- Language: German

Atomlos durch die Macht (English: Nuclear-free through power) is a 2019 Austrian documentary film. Using archival footage and interviews, it traces the history of the anti-nuclear movement in Austria and also addresses alternative and renewable energies and future energy security.

== Content ==
Austria is the only country in the world with a functioning nuclear power plant that, due to a 1978 referendum, never went online. The film traces the history of the Austrian anti-nuclear movement, which originated with the resistance against the planned nuclear power plant in St. Pantaleon-Erla and against the Zwentendorf Nuclear Power Plant. It grew through resistance against the Wackersdorf reprocessing plant, against Temelín, the Chernobyl disaster and Fukushima disaster, and criticism of the Euratom Treaty, and remains active to this day.

Topic Sections

- 00:00 Intro
- 05:35 Title – Chernobyl
- 09:12 St. Pantaleon
- 13:33 Zwentendorf Nuclear Power Plant
- 18:50 Referendum on nuclear power in Austria
- 21:40 Visit to Zwentendorf
- 25:40 Political consequences, democratic participation, Wackersdorf reprocessing plant
- 26:55 Images from the film Wackersdorf
- 30:09 Temelín Nuclear Power Station and activism
- 41:50 Energy and politics, Lambach
- 45:15 Emergence of the Green Party, energy transition
- 46:12 Economics vs. ecology – nuclear phase-out
- 49:12 Euratom Treaty
- 50:44 Costs of nuclear power, civilian and military use
- 52:48 Energy transition with renewables
- 55:40 Climate change and energy sources
- 56:50 Nuclear waste, the relationship between politics and the energy industry
- 1:02:25 Limits of abundance, the war for oil, outlook
- 1:06:20 Solutions for the future

== Protagonists ==
Franz Alt (journalist), Hannes Androsch, Rudolf Anschober, Ulrich Brand, Christoph Chorherr, Klaus Connert, Manfred Doppler, Fred Ebner, Roland Egger, Hans-Josef Fell, Ingo Fliess, Dörte Fouquet, Antony Froggatt, Mathilde Halla, Kurt Langbein, Erwin Mayer, Michael Mittermeier, Heinz Schaden, Daniel Kapp, Sylvia Kotting-Uhl, Thomas Neff, Barack Obama, Josef Pühringer, Bern Scheibner, Hans Schuierer, Wolfgang Schüssel, Gabi Schweiger, Janette Sherman, Sabine von Stockar, Heinz Stockinger, Franz Josef Strauß, Dariusz Szwed, Josef Taucher, Martin Wassermair, Peter Weish, Friedrich Witzany

== Production ==
Markus Kaiser-Mühlecker produced the documentary film on behalf of the Austrian anti-nuclear organization atomstopp_atomkraftfrei leben! The Linz-based organization initiated the film in 2018 to mark the 40th anniversary of the referendum on the commissioning of the Zwentendorf nuclear power plant. The film premiered in 2019 at the renowned Crossing Europe Film Festival in Linz.
