= Anti-nuclear movement in Austria =

Construction of the first Austrian nuclear power plant in Zwentendorf on the Danube, about 30 kilometers upstream from the capital, Vienna, began in 1972. Zwentendorf Nuclear Power Plant was designed as a boiling water reactor with a capacity of 700 MW(e), that was expected to generate about 10% of the Austrian electricity production.

Many groups in the public society stood up against this commercial-technical development. From heritage and family-oriented more conservative people to utopian-driven leftists, activists for nature and the environment to critical technicians. They organised in a platform called "IÖAG - Initiative österreichischer Atomkraftwerksgegner" (transliterated: IOeAG), edited a simple DIN A5 brochure "Wie ist das mit den Atomkraftwerken wirklich?" (What is it about the nuclear power plants, really?) and an in volume and circulation growing newspaper, both financed by private members and a selling price. Many activists organised in groups, presented information desks, spoke to passing people visited and contributed offensive to official information events.

However, in June 1978, the Socialist Chancellor Dr. Kreisky, announced a referendum on nuclear power, which was set down for November 5, 1978. The referendum resulted in a narrow majority against the Zwentendorf plant. Nearly two thirds of the voters (3.26 million people) went to the polls and of these 49.5% voted for, and 50.5% against, nuclear power.

Newspapers did not write much about accidents, that already had happened until then. But Verbund - owning the big water power plants (and the grid) in Austria - feared a lowering of the price of electricity by the upcoming of nuclear power and started an advertising campaign in the months before the referendum in "Kronenzeitung". Suddenly this wide circulated newspaper published a series about the history and the accidents of nuclear power.

The Zwentendorf plant was completed but has never produced electricity from nuclear energy.

Anti-nuclear petition drives started in 2012 with the goal of having the EU abandon nuclear power. Under the EU's Lisbon Treaty, petitions that attract at least one million signatures can seek legislative proposals from the European Commission. This would pave the way for anti-nuclear activists to increase support.

== Organisations ==
=== Platform Against Nuclear Dangers (PLAGE) ===
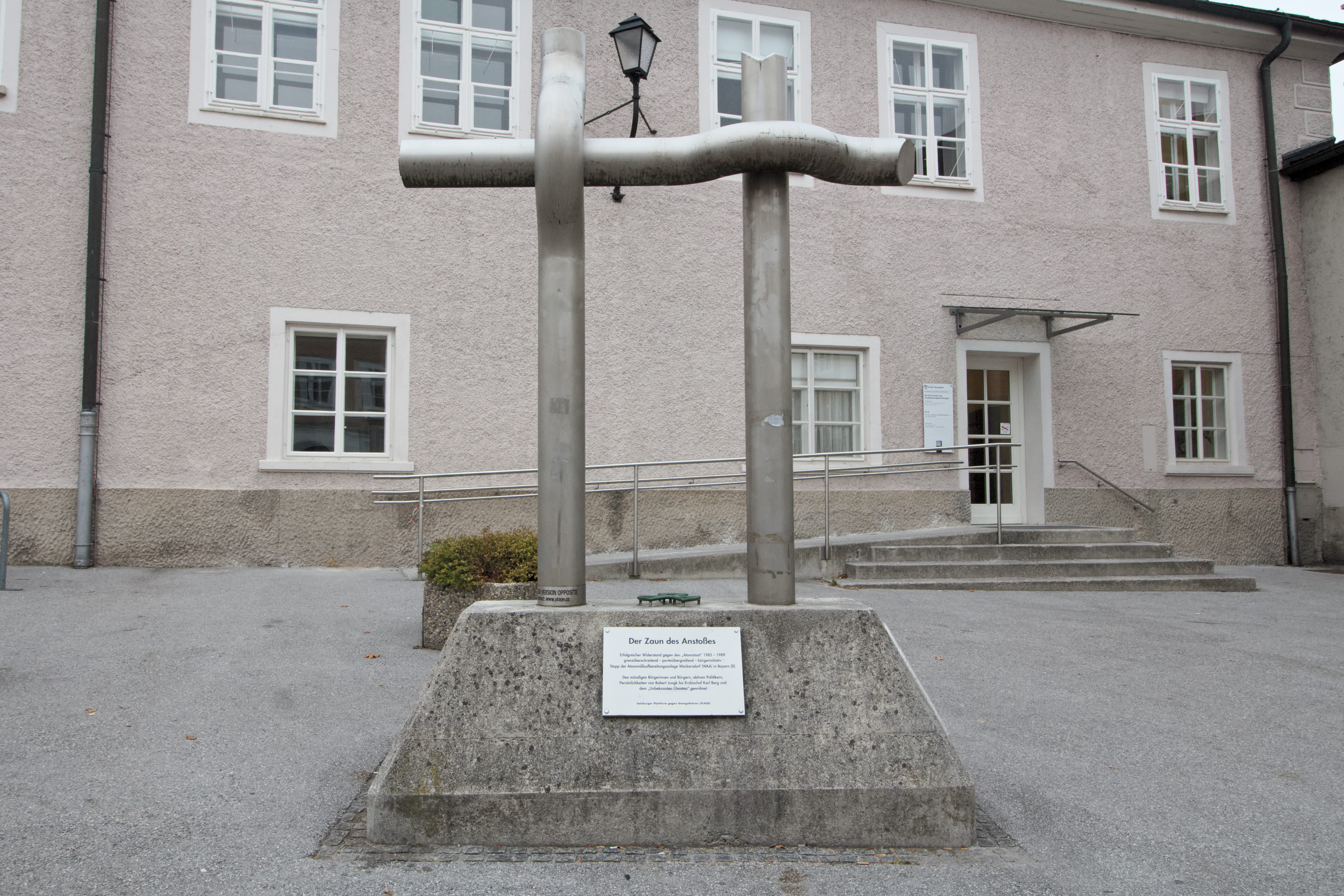
Resistance Memorial − WAA construction fence at Mozartplatz

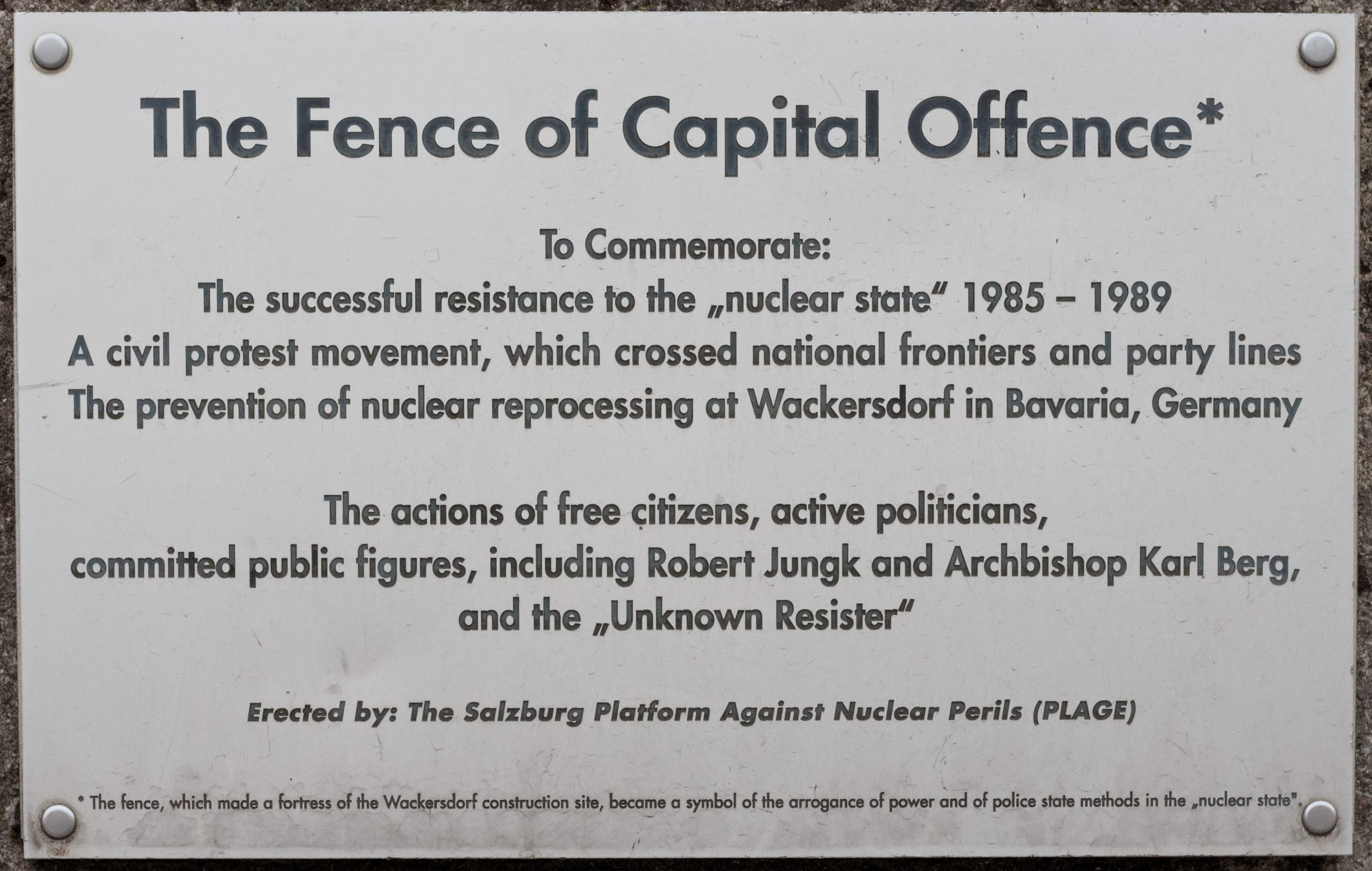

Platform Against Nuclear Dangers (PLAGE) is a nonprofit organization in Salzburg and belongs to the Anti-nuclear movement in Austria.

The PLAGE was founded on May 20, 1986, shortly after the Chernobyl disaster (April 26, 1986), as a Salzburg platform against the Bavarian Wackersdorf reprocessing plant (WAA). By 1987, 120,000 Salzburg signatures had been collected against the nuclear reprocessing plant (a total of almost 900,000 objections, of which 453,000 were from Austria). In the spring of 1989 the decision was made not to build the reprocessing plant. After the WAA collapsed in 1989, the platform was renamed Platform Against Nuclear Dangers (PLAGE). Today the platform also supports renewable energies.

In 2000, PLAGE erected the resistance monument against the WAA at Mozartplatz in Salzburg. "The Fence of Capital Offence" should commemorate the successful resistance to the WAA 1985-1989 - a civil protest movement, which crossed national frontiers and party lines.

PLAGE criticises existing European treaties, first and foremost EURATOM, under which all EU Members pay for nuclear research whether or not they operate plants. 2020 PLAGE got the European Solar Prize - Category "Media and Communication" - Short video "Quit EURATOM"

=== anti atom komitee ===
The long-term goal is a nuclear power plant-free Europe. The association in Freistadt has set itself the task of preventing the construction and operation of nuclear power plants in Europe. Furthermore, the association provides ideal support for all activities relating to renewable energy sources and alternative energies.

=== AtomStop-Nuclear-Free Life! ===
Atom stop atomkraft-frei leben! or Atom stop-Nuclear-Free life! is a non-profit, non-partisan association based in Linz. They are fighting for a Europe - and ultimately a world - without nuclear power.

== Recent developments ==
Since the 2010s, Austrian anti-nuclear politics have increasingly focused on European Union energy policy, state-aid decisions and the classification of nuclear power in climate finance, rather than on domestic reactor construction. Austria has continued to oppose nuclear power despite not operating any nuclear power plants of its own.

In 2015, Austria brought a legal challenge against the European Commission's approval of British state aid for the Hinkley Point C nuclear power station. Luxembourg supported Austria's challenge. In September 2020, the Court of Justice of the European Union dismissed Austria's appeal and upheld the Commission's approval of the project.

Austria also opposed the inclusion of nuclear energy in the European Union taxonomy for sustainable investment. In October 2022, Austria filed a legal challenge against the European Commission's decision to classify certain nuclear and gas investments as sustainable, arguing among other points that nuclear energy could not meet the taxonomy's "do no significant harm" requirement because of concerns over radioactive waste. Luxembourg supported Austria's action, while environmental organisations including Greenpeace filed separate challenges. In September 2025, the General Court of the Court of Justice of the European Union rejected Austria's challenge and upheld the Commission's approach, while Austria's environment ministry said it would examine possible further steps, including an appeal.

Austria has also worked with other EU member states to resist the inclusion of nuclear power in renewable-energy policy. In March 2023, Reuters reported that eleven countries led by Austria, including Germany and Spain, met to push to keep nuclear energy out of EU renewable-energy targets, arguing that mixing nuclear power into the renewable-energy law would distract from expanding wind and solar power. In March 2024, Austria and Germany led a group of thirteen countries calling for EU policy to prioritise renewable energy and power grids, in contrast to a pro-nuclear group led by France.

Austria has also opposed public support for nuclear projects in neighbouring EU countries. In 2018, Austria sued the European Commission over its approval of Hungary's plan to expand the Paks nuclear power plant with Russian assistance. After Austria appealed an earlier dismissal, an advocate-general of the Court of Justice of the European Union stated in February 2025 that the court should rule in Austria's favour on the question of whether the Commission should have examined the direct award of the construction contract under EU procurement rules.

Austria has remained active in nuclear disarmament diplomacy. The first meeting of states parties to the Treaty on the Prohibition of Nuclear Weapons was held in Vienna from 21 to 23 June 2022 under Austrian presidency. The meeting adopted a political declaration and a 50-point action plan intended to implement the 2017 treaty and reinforce norms against the use and threat of use of nuclear weapons.

== Resources ==
- Kein Kernkraftwerk in Zwentendorf! - 30 Jahre danach (No nuclear power plant in Zwentendorf! - 30 years after) Museum Joanneum Graz, exhibition 01.11.2008-30.01.2009 and book by Sigrid Schönfelder for CLIO and Büro der Erinnerungen, German, visited 23.05.2014
- Kernkraftwerk in Zwentendorf! - 30 Jahre Zwentendorf KulturServer Graz, German, visited 23.05.2014
- Das wichtigste NEIN unseres Lebens - AKW-ABSTIMMUNG Zwentendorf Source: Österreichische Mediathek, Online archive, article about the history and some historic audio documents, German, visited 23.05.2014
- Akustische Chronik 1977-1978 Source: Österreichische Mediathek, Online Archive, German, visited 23.05.2014
- 30 Jahre Zwentendorf: Ausstellung in Graz Exhibition announcement - Kleine Zeitung, 31.10.2008, German, visited 23.05.2014
- Atomlos durch die Macht (film - 2019)

== See also ==
- The Greens – The Green Alternative
- Hildegard Breiner
- Robert Jungk
- Freda Meissner-Blau
- Energy in Austria
- Nuclear power phase-out
- Viki Weisskopf
