= Zwentendorf =

Zwentendorf an der Donau
- Municipality
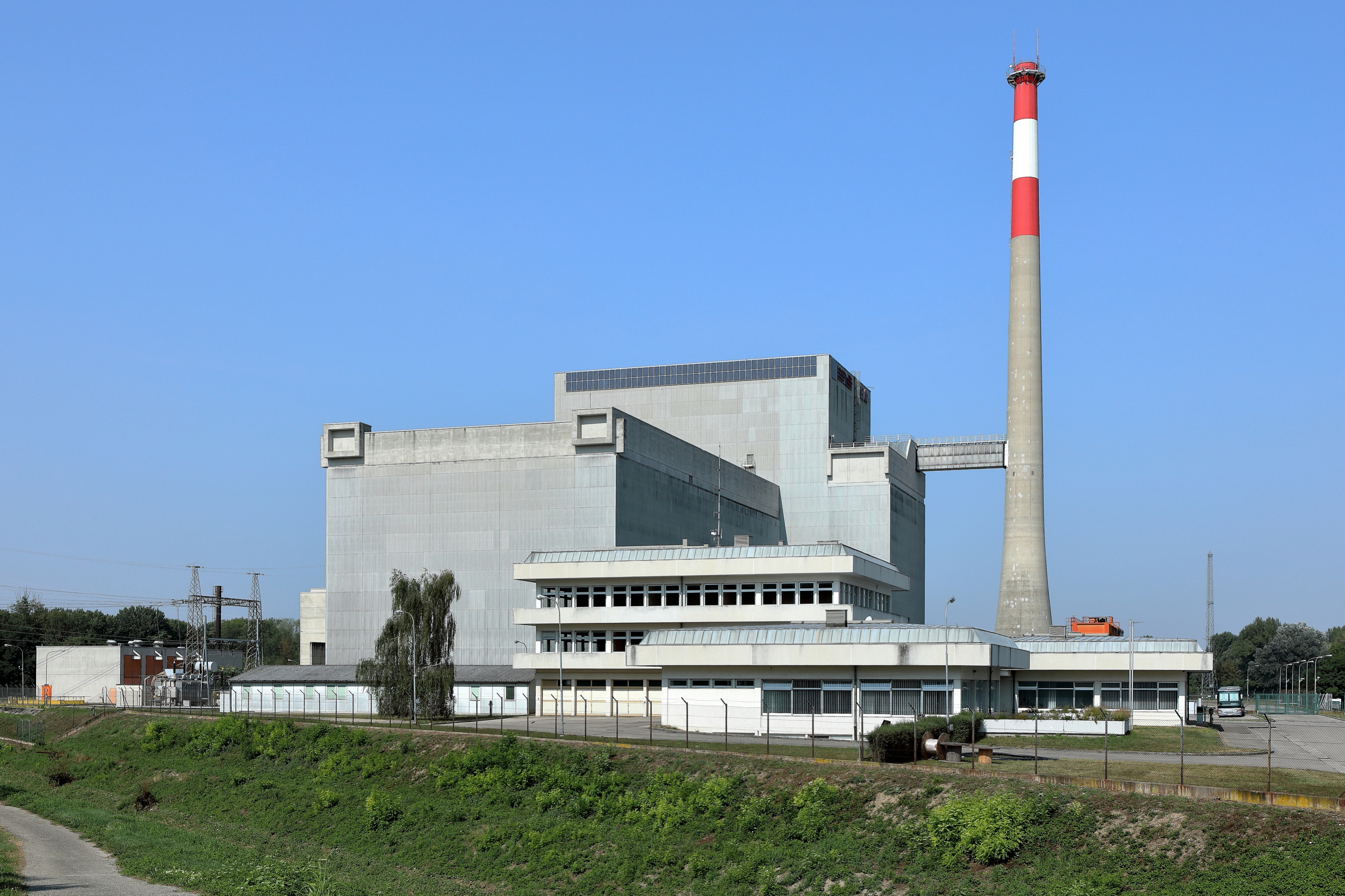
- Nuclear power station at Zwentendorf

- Coat of arms

- Location within Austria
- Coordinates: 48°20′33″N 15°54′50″E
- Country: Austria
- State: Lower Austria
- District: Tulln

Government
  - Mayor: Marion Török (SPÖ)

Area
  - Total: 53.9 km^{2} (20.8 sq mi)
- Elevation: 182 m (597 ft)

Population (2018-01-01)
  - Total: 3,982
  - Density: 73.9/km^{2} (191/sq mi)
- Time zone: UTC+1 (CET)
  - Summer (DST): UTC+2 (CEST)
- Postal code: 3435
- Area code: 02277
- Vehicle registration: TU
- Website: www.zwentendorf.at

Zwentendorf an der Donau is a small market municipality in the Austrian state of Lower Austria. It is located at 48°21′N 15°54′E, in the Tulln Basin on the southern bank of the Danube. The place attained public attention as the site of the only Austrian nuclear power station, which was completed but never went into operation. In a referendum on 5 November 1978, a narrow majority of 50.5% voted against putting the Zwentendorf nuclear plant into operation.

== Population ==
Historical population
Year	Pop.	±%
1869	2,562	—
1880	2,624	+2.4%
1890	2,585	−1.5%
1900	2,529	−2.2%
1910	2,782	+10.0%
1923	2,772	−0.4%
1934	2,945	+6.2%
1951	3,079	+4.6%
1961	3,123	+1.4%
1971	3,123	+0.0%
1981	3,170	+1.5%
1991	3,280	+3.5%
2001	3,715	+13.3%
2011	3,920	+5.5%
2014	4,001	+2.1%

== History ==
Near Zwentendorf was from 1 to the 5th century a.d. a Roman fort (Asturis). It was a part from Limes Norici of the Roman province Noricum.

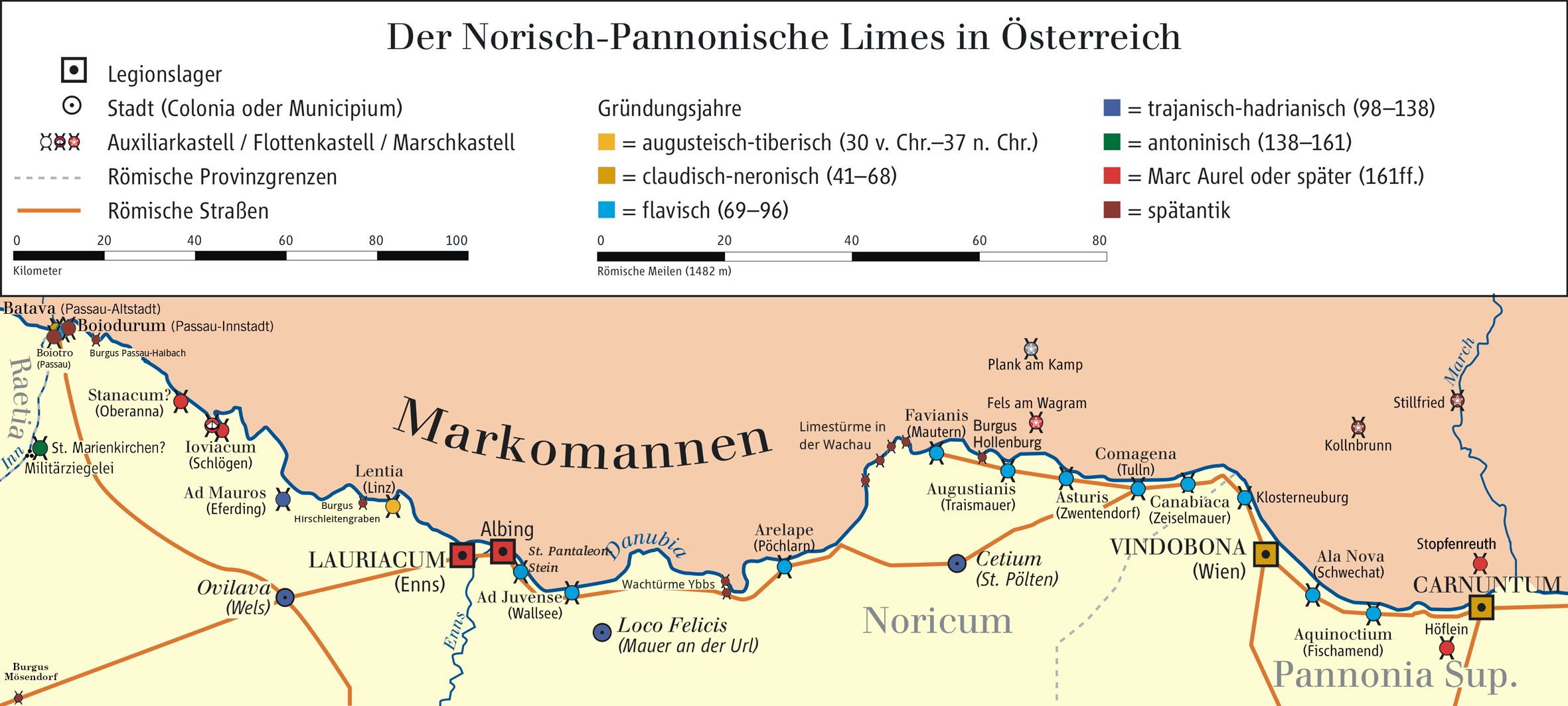
Limes Norici

== See also ==
- Anti-nuclear movement in Austria
- Freda Meissner-Blau
- Hildegard Breiner
- Zwentendorf Nuclear Power Plant
