= Freda Meissner-Blau =

Austrian politician and activist (1927–2015)

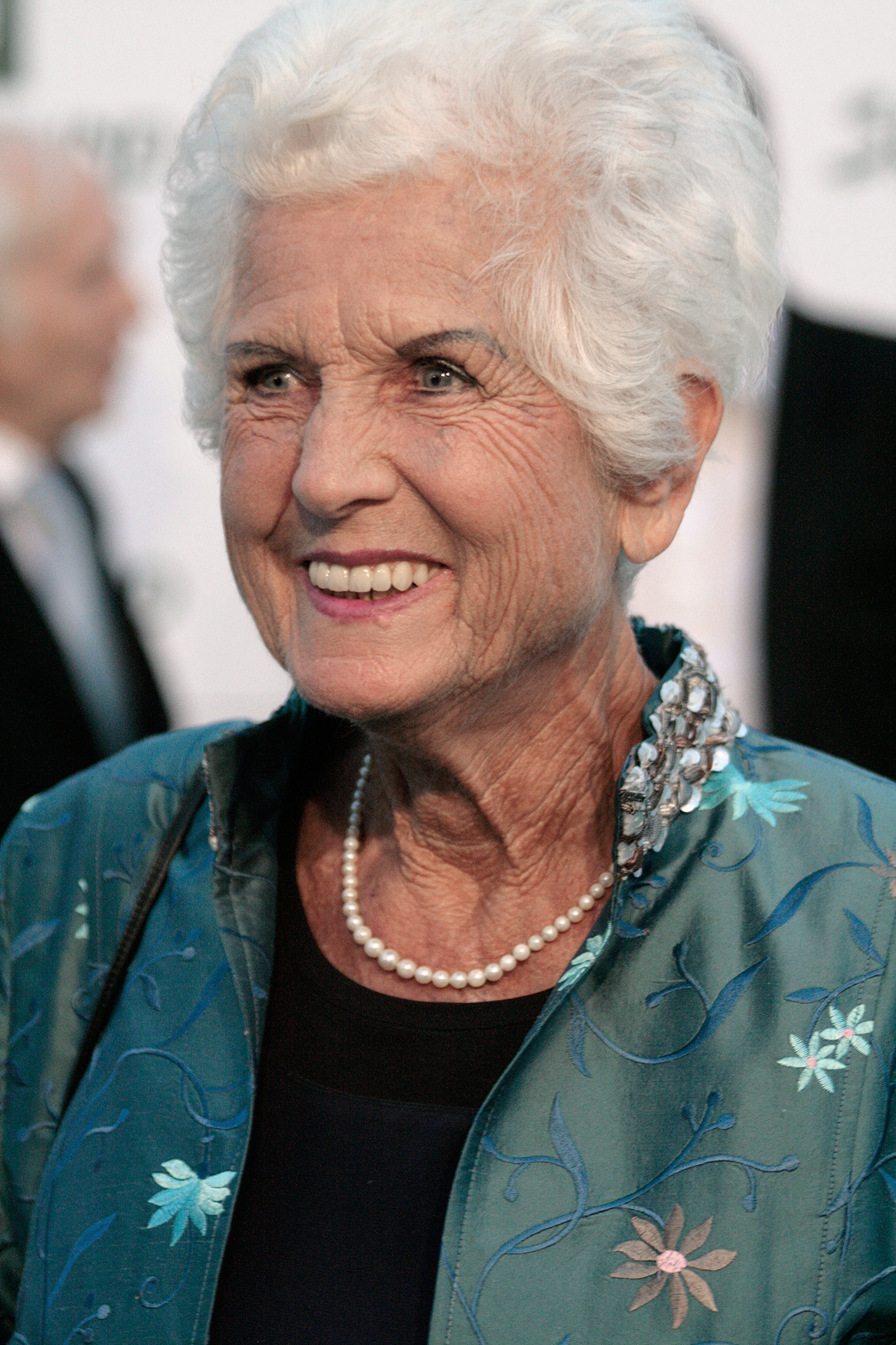
- Meissner-Blau in 2009

Spokeswoman of the Green Party
- In office 12 February 1987 – 6 December 1988
- Preceded by: Office established
- Succeeded by: Johannes Voggenhuber

Personal details
- Born: 11 March 1927 Dresden, Weimar Republic
- Died: 22 December 2015 (aged 88) Vienna, Austria
- Party: The Greens

Freda Meissner-Blau (11 March 1927 – 22 December 2015) was an Austrian politician, activist, and prominent figurehead in the Austrian environmental movement. She was a founder and the federal spokesperson of the Austrian Green Party.

== Early life ==
Freda Meissner was born in Dresden in 1927, the youngest of four children. Her mother was from a wealthy family of industrialists. Her father, Dr. Ferdinand Meissner Hohenmeiss, was an economist and journalist. Until age three, Meissner grew up in Reichenberg (now Liberec), before her family moved to Linz, where Meissner attended school. She grew up in a liberal, educated household and enjoyed nature, culture, and art. The family moved to Vienna in 1938, where Ferdinand became editor of a newspaper that was critical of the Nazi movement. He was deemed an enemy of the state for his outspoken opposition and he fled to the United Kingdom in 1939. To avoid the Nazi reprisal of Sippenhaft (kin liability), Meissner's parents divorced and the family moved back to Liberec. Meissner continued her education there, and then in Vienna and Dresden. During this time many of Meissner's relatives and friends perished during the war, and Meissner's own experiences witnessing the bombing of Dresden, galvanized her ambition to pursue progressive and activist causes.

Meissner returned to Vienna in 1947 and obtained a leaving certificate before going on to communication studies and journalism, working during her studies for the American occupation in Vienna. She travelled to England that same year to visit her father, before completing nursing school and then finally moving to Frankfurt, Germany to study medicine at the Goethe University Frankfurt. While studying there she met Georges de Pawloff who was working for the French occupation in West Germany. They married in 1953.

== Early career ==
In the early 1950s Meissner and her husband moved to Central Africa, in what was then the Belgian Congo, where they both worked for a Germany company operating there. Their first child, Ted Oliver, was born there in 1954. During their time there they witnessed the bloody independence struggle and the onset of the Congo Crisis – experiences that would form the foundation of Meissner's commitment to causes in the developing world.

She then underwent a career change and in the 1960s she moved to Paris and joined the social science department of UNESCO. During her tenure there one of her jobs was to translate corporate documents relating to offers and proposals for the construction of nuclear power plants. After this exposure she became increasingly interested in the subject, and formed strong opinions on the environmental and social dangers of nuclear power. Subsequently, she became an activist in the anti-nuclear movement. In 1962 she returned with her family to Vienna, where her husband worked for the International Atomic Energy Agency. Meissner became general secretary of the newly formed Institute for Advanced Studies. She and Georges gave birth to twins, Alexandra and Nicholas, in 1963.

In 1968 Meissner was again living in Paris, and participated in the movements surrounding the protests of 1968. She identified herself with a number of progressive and social causes of the time, including women's rights, civil rights, environmentalism, democracy and antiestablishmentarianism. She became estranged from Georges, and their marriage broke up in political disagreement. In 1970 she remarried Paul Blau, with whom she had a long acquaintance and shared many ethical and social outlooks. Paul was a prominent figure in the trade union movement, and was editor of the Arbeiter-Zeitung (worker's newspaper) from 1967 to 1970. From 1970 to 1972 he worked as a press and cultural attaché in Paris.

== Activism ==
=== Anti-Nuclear movement ===
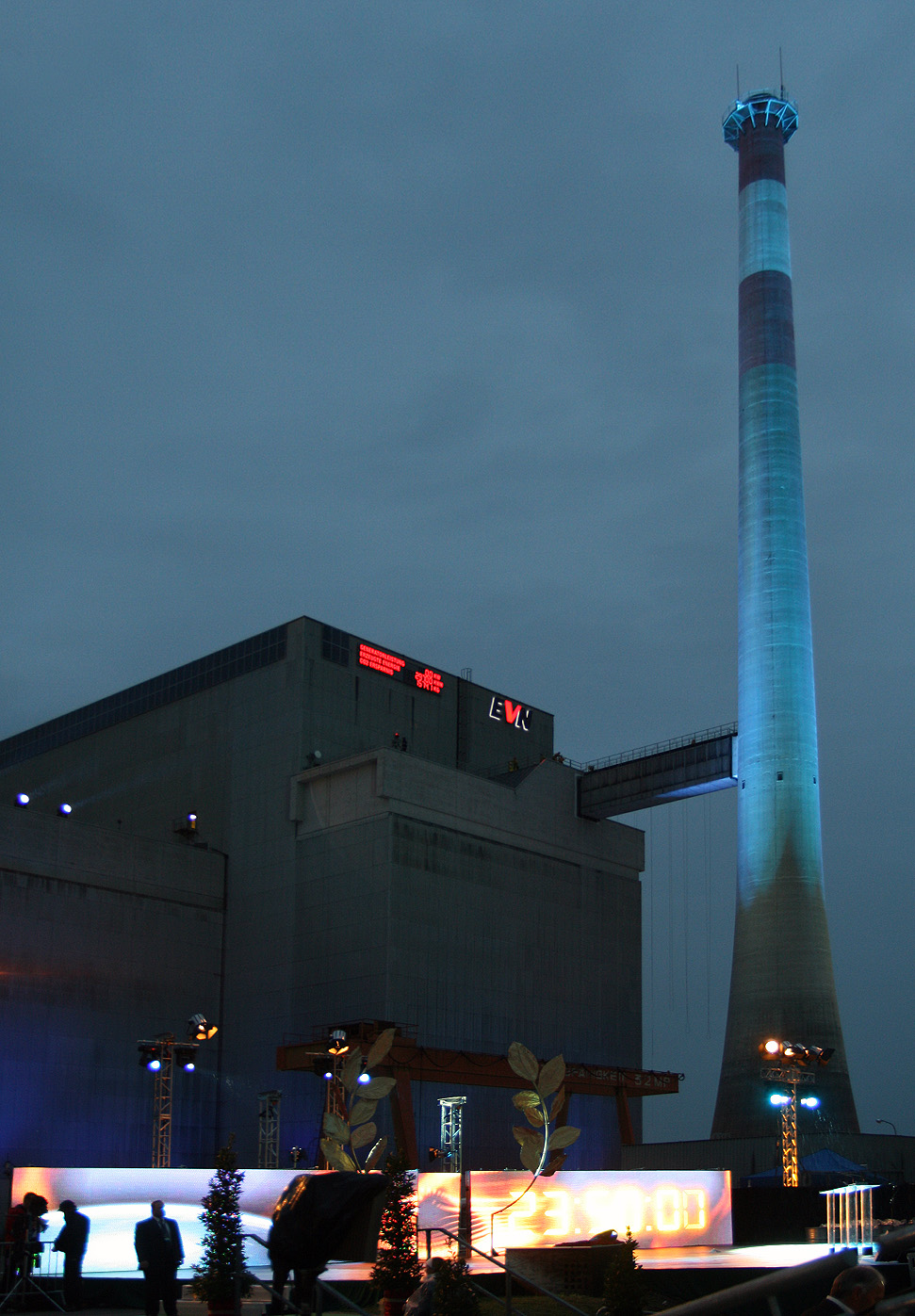
The unfinished Zwentendorf Nuclear Facility in 2009, which Meissner-Blau successfully campaigned against in 1978

In 1972 the couple returned to Vienna. Meissner-Blau worked as the Bildungsreferentin (education secretary) for the industrial giant OMV where she took an active role holding seminars and running classes for the working class employees. She came into contact with numerous figures in the union movement and leaders within the Socialist Party of Austria (SPÖ). During the 1970s the issue of nuclear power was at the forefront of environmental activism, and was a particularly contentious issue in Austrian politics. In the late 1970s this issue came to a head with the planned construction of six nuclear power plants, the first of which was the Nuclear Power Facility at Zwentendorf. Opposition to the plant became increasingly vociferous as the plant neared completion in 1978. Meissner-Blau became a prominent leader in the fight against the plant, appearing frequently in the media as a spokesperson for the opposition movement. She was joined by her husband Paul, Stefan Micko, Wolfgang Pekny, and Peter Weish as the main figureheads for the cause.

In 1978, confident of majority public support, the socialist Chancellor of Austria, Bruno Kreisky, called a referendum on the issue of nuclear power in Austria. This was the first referendum called during the Second Austrian Republic, and the referendum called for people to vote on whether to commission the Zwentendorf nuclear power plant, by now 98% complete. Kreisky was confident of general support for the plant, and set the referendum date for 18 November 1978.

Meissner-Blau and fellow activists from the 'Initiative of Opponents of Atomic Power' (IOeAG) coordinated the campaign for the "No" vote. The campaign concentrated on the lack of safety precautions at Zwentendorf, though the campaign proclaimed a general rejection of nuclear power. Also highlighted was the proximity of the plant to Vienna (just 40 kilometers), which Meissner-Blau and the IOeAG used to great effect in showing social consequences of a nuclear catastrophe. The campaign was well-organized, enthusiastic and professional. As the campaign wore on it became clear that public opinion was changing. Kreisky, increasingly concerned at the campaign's effectiveness, subsequently attempted to link the poll to a vote of confidence in the Socialist government. Meissner-Blau and fellow campaign leaders were however unswayed by the calls from the Socialists. To the shock of the government and opposition alike, the 'No' vote on election day eked out a slim majority of 50.5%, winning the absolute vote by just 30,068. The loss of the referendum was a severe embarrassment to the SPÖ government, which was compelled in the aftermath to pass laws against any future nuclear development in Austria. Meissner-Blau herself became a well recognized and her campaign vaulted environmental issues into the public spotlight in Austria.

=== Hainburg Dam ===
In 1983 the Austrian government under the SPÖ chancellor Fred Sinowatz had given approval to a series of plans from Österreichische Donaukraftwerke AG to construct a hydroelectric power plant near Hainburg. Deemed as a project of particular and special interest to the public, the government bypassed and shortened normal regulatory processes to secure quick approval. The plans were deposited and formal planning began in late 1983, with clearing and earthworks beginning early in 1984. However, the plant was to be located in the middle of what is now the Donau-Auen Nationalpark (Danube Meadows National Park) – a large and environmentally sensitive flood plain that is one of the last of its size in Europe. By mid-1984 a number of environmental opinion leaders, among them Freda Meissner-Blau, started a campaign which sought to overturn the decision. A Volksbegehren (citizen's petition) was launched and a media campaign began to attempt to inform the public of the environmental risks posed by the project. As a leading figure in the campaign, Meissner-Blau took part in the organization of mass protests during the latter half of 1984, culminating in almost over 8000 staging a sit-in at the worksite on 8 December 1984. The government attempted to restart work at the site by using federal police to clear the protesters on 19 December, however the events escalated into violence and hundreds of protesters were injured. That evening, Meissner-Blau and fellow environmental leaders took part in a mass protest in Vienna, where 40,000 marched against the government. As a result, the government bowed to public pressure, and Meissner-Blau and her husband were part of the opposition representation that negotiated a 'Christmas truce' with the government. Over the Christmas period thousands made a point of holidaying in the Hainburg area. By March 1985, a citizen's petition with 353,906 signatures against the plant was submitted to the parliament by Austrian Nobel laureate Konrad Lorenz. The petition was successful, and the government was obliged to back down from the plan.

== Political career ==
=== Green movement and presidential campaign ===
The green political movement in Austria had originated in the aftermath of the 1978 nuclear referendum, with a green list presenting candidates at the 1983 Austrian Federal Election, but it began in earnest in the aftermath of Hainburg. Up to that point, two main Green political movements were in operation – the Alternative List of Austria (ALÖ) and the United Greens of Austria (VGÖ). The parties were disorganized and fractious, and little consensus could be reached between the two for presenting a united political front. After the victory over the Hainburg dam case, a victory for which neither party could legitimately claim credit, efforts were made in 1984 and 1985 to unify the movement and present a single list for the 1987 elections. Yet the attempt worsened ructions, with the VGÖ declining to amalgamate due to the ideological and inter-personal differences, and the ALÖ dividing into two opposing factions.

In October 1985, the moderate section of the former ALÖ met in Salzburg and formed the Citizen's Parliamentary Initiative (BIP) as an attempt to bring together a more professionalised and less ideologically divided Green political organisation. The meeting was arranged under the auspices of former ALÖ leaders Günther Nenning, Gerhard Heilingbrunner and Michael Mayrhofer. Meissner-Blau and a number of other leading greens figures were in attendance at the first meeting on 26 October 1985. As a well spoken, widely respected and nationally known figure in the environmental movement, Meissner-Blau was nominated by the BIP to run as the first green candidate for the Austrian Presidency at a meeting in Graz on 6 January 1986. In February, the opposing left-wing of the former ALÖ declined to join the BIP, instead forming their own Green political movement – the Green Alternative Rally (GRAS). Momentum appeared to be on the side of the BIP though, as a number of green fractions moved over to join with the BIP. The media gave a large degree of attention to Meissner-Blau in the lead-up to the May Presidential vote. The movement's profile received a significant boost after the Chernobyl disaster in April and government controversy over the government deployment of the Saab 35 Draken fighter airplane. On 4 May, Meisser-Blau received 5.5% of the vote. The result, whilst still small, was the best result for the Green movement to that point, and the campaign had cemented Meissner-Blau's position at the apex of that movement.

=== National Council (Parliament) ===
In mid-1986 the SPÖ-FPÖ coalition under Franz Vranitzky collapsed when the junior coalition partner in government, the Freedom Party of Austria, elected the controversial Jörg Haider as their new party leader. Vranitzky determined that his government would not stand with Haider as Vice-Chancellor and early elections were called for 23 November 1986. The pressure for the green movement to present a united front for the election increased, with Günther Nenning attempting to bring together the BIP, VGÖ and GRAS parties onto a single candidates list. Meissner-Blau emerged as the most popular and uniformly acceptable candidate to lead the list, and she once again assumed leadership of the campaign under the banner The Green Alternative – List Freda Meissner-Blau. Meissner-Blau proved to be a popular and unifying figure in the movement, however she and Nenning were ultimately unsuccessful at uniting all the dissident factions. On 4 October, GRAS – the largest green movement not yet committed to running under the Meissner-Blau list – voted on whether to join the main list or run separately under another leader. The left-wing dominated GRAS was heavily divided on the prospect of the moderate Meissner-Blau's leadership, and the final ballot saw left-wing historian Andrea Komlosy receive 222 votes to Meissner-Blau's 150. The loss came as a shock and a considerable disappointment to Nenning and Meissner-Blau. Yet in spite of this the majority of the green movement continued to rally behind Meissner-Blau's leadership, and a strong campaign was made which presented for the first time a professional and viable political alternative to the Austrian public. The 1986 election would prove to be a major upset in traditional Austrian politics with both major parties (the SPÖ and ÖVP) losing seats to the smaller Greens and FPÖ. The Greens polled 4.8% (234,028 votes), taking them over the crucial 4% threshold, and 8 candidates (including Meissner-Blau) were elected to the Austrian National Council. The alternative green lists run by GRAS and disaffected segments of the VGÖ captured only around 7000 votes, or 0.1%.

Now in parliament the elected members grouped into a formal parliamentary party – the Austrian Green Party. Meissner-Blau was elected the first federal spokesperson and leader of the party at the inaugural party conference in Klagenfurt on 12 February 1987. The party initially proved to be structurally complex and continued to suffer from factional infighting. Activism by Greens in the late 1980s hampered the image of the parliamentary party, and there emerged a degree of mistrust between the suit-and-tie parliamentary wing and the more activist grass-roots party base. Meissner-Blau however served as a popular and moderating leader of the party. She served on a number of parliamentary committees and through speeches and legislative activism she assisted in establishing a unified parliamentary voice and cultivating a professional image for the group. After two years as leader and securing effective consolidation of the movement, she retired from the party, leaving her parliamentary seat on 6 December 1988.

=== International Human Rights Tribunal ===
In June 1995 Meissner-Blau has chaired the first International Human Rights Tribunal in Vienna. Her co-chair was Gerhard Oberschlick, editor of the journal FORVM. The tribunal was dedicated to the persecution of lesbians, gays, bisexuals and transgender persons in Austria during the period from 1945 to 1995. An assembly of Austrian human rights activists condemned the Republic of Austria in all seven cases that were brought forward by the LGBT-community. As a consequence of this endeavour and other efforts all discriminating laws against LGBT-persons in Austria have been abolished between 1996 and 2005.

=== Retirement ===
Since her resignation from Parliament Meissner-Blau worked and consulted for various international bodies. She also worked as a writer and professional speaker, appearing at various conferences in her retirement. In 1991 she was awarded the Konrad-Lorenz-Prize, the official Austrian state award for environmental achievement. This was followed by a Lifetime Achievement Nuclear-Free Future Award from the Franz Moll Foundation and being named amongst the first winners of the Save the World Award which were announced in 2009. Her husband Paul died in October 2005. She died on 22 December 2015, at the age of 88. She was cremated at Feuerhalle Simmering.

== See also ==
- Anti-nuclear movement in Austria
- Hildegard Breiner
- The Greens – The Green Alternative
- Nuclear-Free Future Award
