= Energy in Austria =

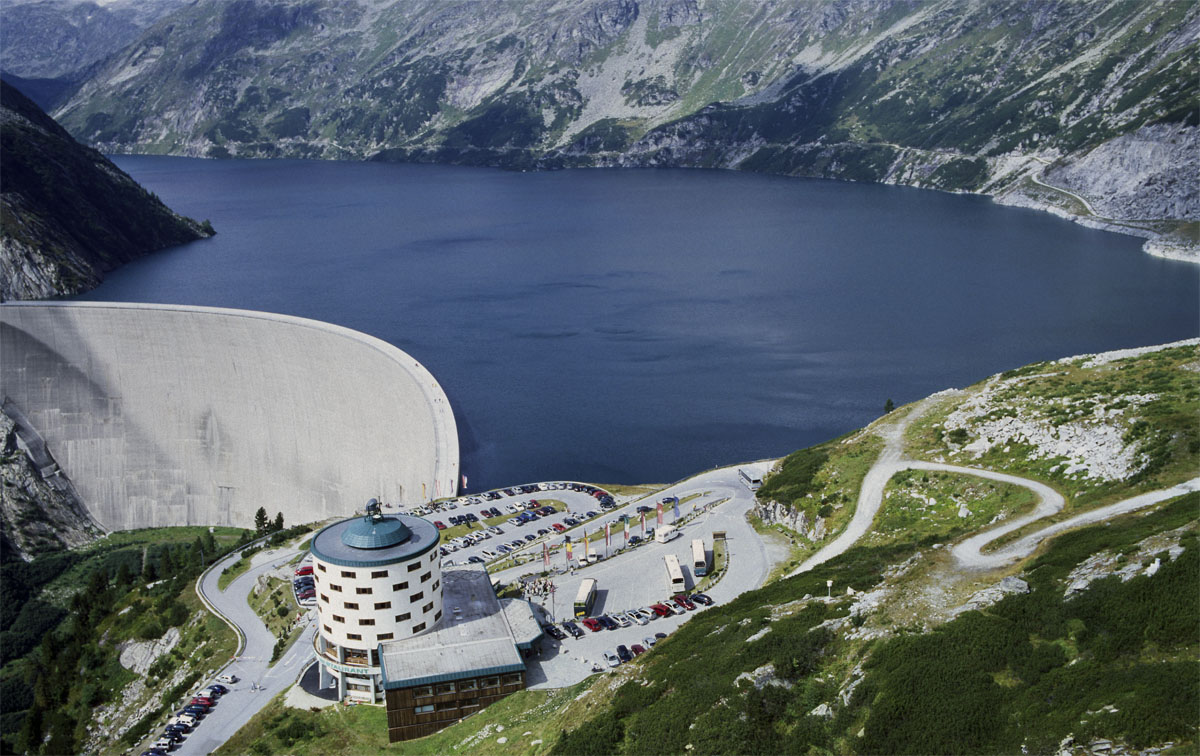
The Kölnbrein Dam in Carinthia

Energy in Austria describes energy and electricity production, consumption and import in Austria. Austria is very reliant on hydro as an energy source, supported by imported oil and natural gas supplies. It is planned by 2030 to become 100% electricity supplied by renewable sources, primarily hydro, wind and solar.

== Targets ==
The Austrian energy plan made in 2020 has the following targets:

- Carbon neutrality at the latest by 2040
  - phasing out all oil and coal heating systems by 2035
  - restricting gas heating systems in new builds from 2025
  - develop renewable hydrogen
  - phase out coal usage in industry
  - increase electricity capacity and make it carbon neutral by 2030
    - 1 million solar systems on private houses by 2030
  - adjusting the tax system to favour green developments

== Energy statistics ==
2020 energy statistics

Electricity production per energy source (billion kWh)
Type	Amount
Hydro	44.97
Fossil fuel	12.44
Wind power	6.72
Biomass	5.29
Solar	2.00

Electricity (billion kWh)
Category	Amount
Consumption	69.91
Production	71.49
Import	24.52
Export	22.92

Natural Gas (billion m^{3})
Category	Amount
Consumption	9.21
Produce	0.92
Import	14.11
Export	2.80

Crude Oil (barrels per day)
Category	Amount
Consumption	278,700
Production	20,100
Import	168,300

CO_{2} emissions:
59.14 million tons

== Energy plans ==
In 2021 Austria passed a Renewable-Expansion-Act (”Erneuerbaren Ausbau Gesetz”, EAG) Nationalrat stipulating a goal of 100% renewable electricity by 2030, meaning that 27 TWh of renewable power need to be added by 2030.

== Energy types ==
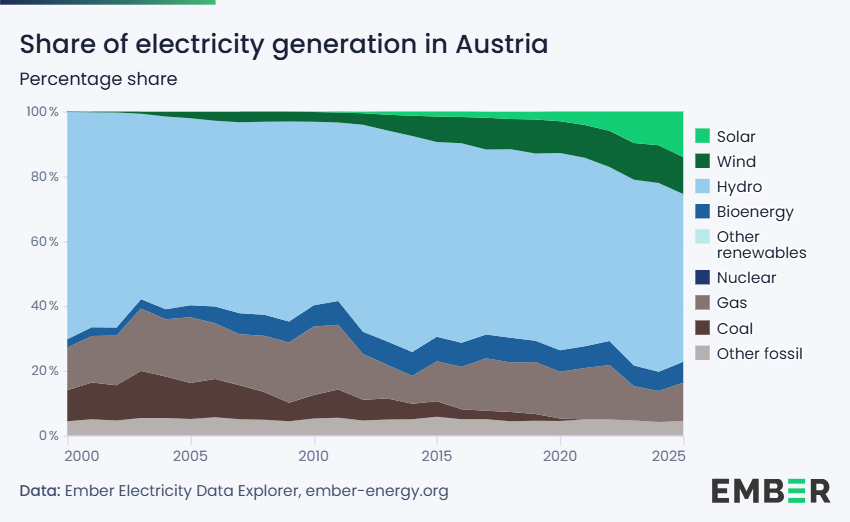
Electricity generation in Austria by source - percentage share

=== Fossil fuels ===
Oil

Imported oil accounted for 35.4% of energy consumed in 2022.

Gas

Gas accounted for 16.8 percent of energy consumed in 2022. Gas from Russia to Austria transits through Ukraine, whose contract with Russia expires in 2024, and via Bulgaria, who in November 2023 imposed a €10.2 per MWh transit fee, around 20% of the value of the gas. On November 16, 2024, Russia halted gas supplies to Austria on Saturday in a dispute over payments.

Coal

The last coal plant closed in 2020. The government considered reopening the plant in 2022.

Companies

OMV AG, a multinational integrated oil, gas and petrochemical company, is the largest energy business in Austria, with a turnover of €36 billion in 2021.

=== Hydro power ===
With over 3,000 hydro energy plants in operation, in 2021 Hydro power provided 14.1 GW and accounted for 54% of Austria’s total installed power generation capacity and 58% of total power generation.

Hydro power in the summer of 2022 has generated less power, due to water shortages, due to climate changes.

To meet the 2030 plan, an additional 1,500 MW of hydro energy capacity will be needed.

Verbund AG is Austria's largest electricity provider. Verbund covers around 40 percent of electricity demands in Austria and generates 90 percent from hydro power. Annual turnover is around €10 billion.

=== Renewable energy ===
Austria renewable electricity production by source

Years in which the last three renewable power levels achieved
Achievement	Year	Achievement	Year	Achievement	Year
25%	2006	30%	2009	35%	2014

According to Austrian Environment Minister Nikolaus Berlakovich Austria has a target of 34% renewable energy by 2020 and 100% self-sufficiency in energy by 2050. In Austria will be 100,000 new green jobs up to 2020, Berlakovich hoped in the European Wind Energy Event 2013 by EWEA.

==== Solar power ====
Photovoltaic systems contributed almost 6 percent to domestic electricity production in 2022 with 3,792 MW capacity..

1.4 GW of solar energy capacity was added in 2022.

An additional 10.5 GW of solar PV will be needed between 2022 and 2030 to meet the planned renewable target.

==== Wind power ====
In 2000 there was just 77 MW of wind capacity, by 2010 this had grown to 1,011 MW. In 2020 there was 3,105 MW and in 2023 it had reached 3,573 MW of wind power capacity in Austria.

Some states in Austria have forward looking plans to double the 2021 wind power by 2030 by expanding existing wind parks and creating new ones.

==== Biomass ====
Biomass provides over 18% of electricity capacity

== Energy use ==
31.3% of energy in 2021 was used by transport which is the economic sector with the largest consumption of energy in Austria.

== See also ==
- Climate change in Austria
- Anti-nuclear movement in Austria
