= Hildegard Breiner =

Austrian activist

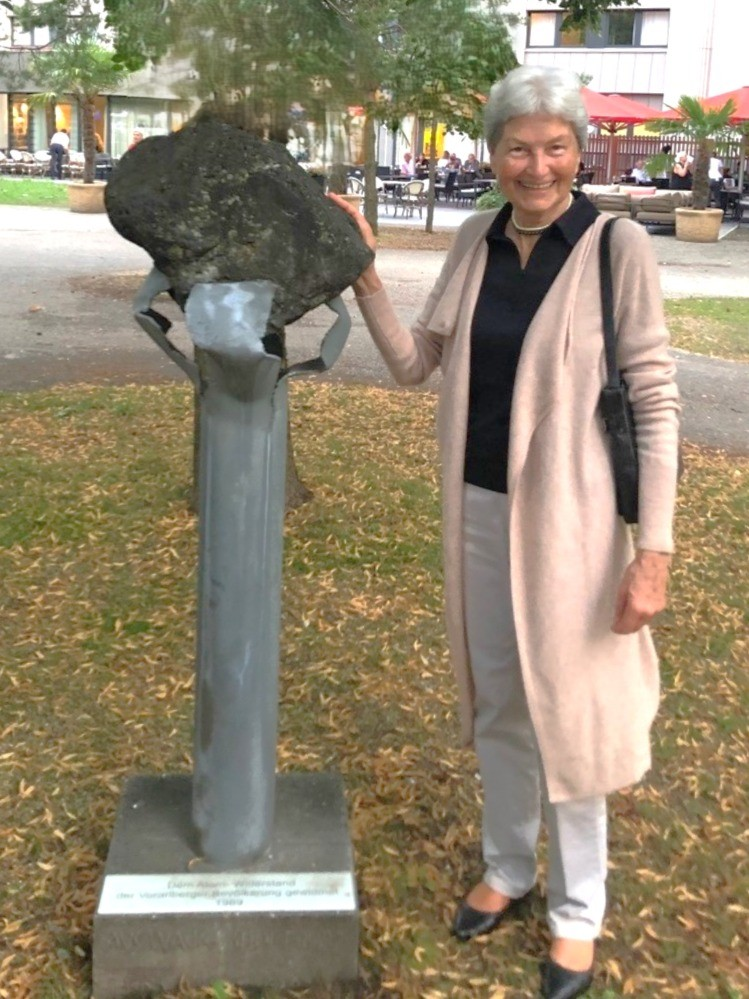
Hildegard Breiner at the WAA memorial stone in Bregenz, 2019

Hildegard Breiner (* March 28, 1936 in Bregenz) is an Austrian activist in the anti-nuclear movement in Austria.

== Personal life ==
Hildegard Breiner is from Vorarlberg, Austria, where she and her late husband led the anti-nuclear campaign against Zwentendorf Nuclear Power Plant in the 1970s. In 1978, an unprecedented 85 percent of the voters in Vorarlberg cast their votes against Zwentendorf, tipping the scales of the nationwide referendum. In the second half of the 1980s, Hildegard Breiner played a major role in opposition to the nuclear Wackersdorf reprocessing plant (WAA) to be built at Wackersdorf in neighbouring Bavaria, Germany.

== Awards ==
- 2000: Binding Prize for Nature and Environmental Protection
- 2004: Nuclear-Free Future Award (Lifetime Achievement Category)
- 2008: Toni Russ Prize
- 2018: Silver Medal of Honor of the State of Vorarlberg
- 2019: Eurosolar Prize - Austria
- 2021: Decoration of Honour for Services to the Republic of Austria

== See also ==
- Anti-nuclear movement in Austria
- Anti-nuclear movement in Germany
- Freda Meissner-Blau

== Literature ==
- Hildegard Breiner: Atom-Widerstandsgeschichte(n) (Nuclear resistance historyies), in: Alois Niederstätter, Ulrich Nachbaur: 200 Jahre Gemeindeorganisation. Aufbruch in eine neue Zeit. Vorarlberger Almanach zum Jubiläumsjahr 2005. Bregenz 2006, ISBN 978-3-902622-10-5
- Leonie Hosp: Die Lausmädchen. Frauen in der österreichischen Anti-Atom-Bewegung ca. 1970 bis 1990 (The Rascal Girls: Women in the Austrian Anti-Nuclear Movement, circa 1970 to 1990), University of Natural Resources and Life Sciences, Vienna, Vienna 2019, eg. p.40, ISSN 1726-3816
