= Zwentendorf Nuclear Power Plant =

Never-used Austrian power plant built in the 1970s

Coordinates: 48.3544°N 15.8847°E

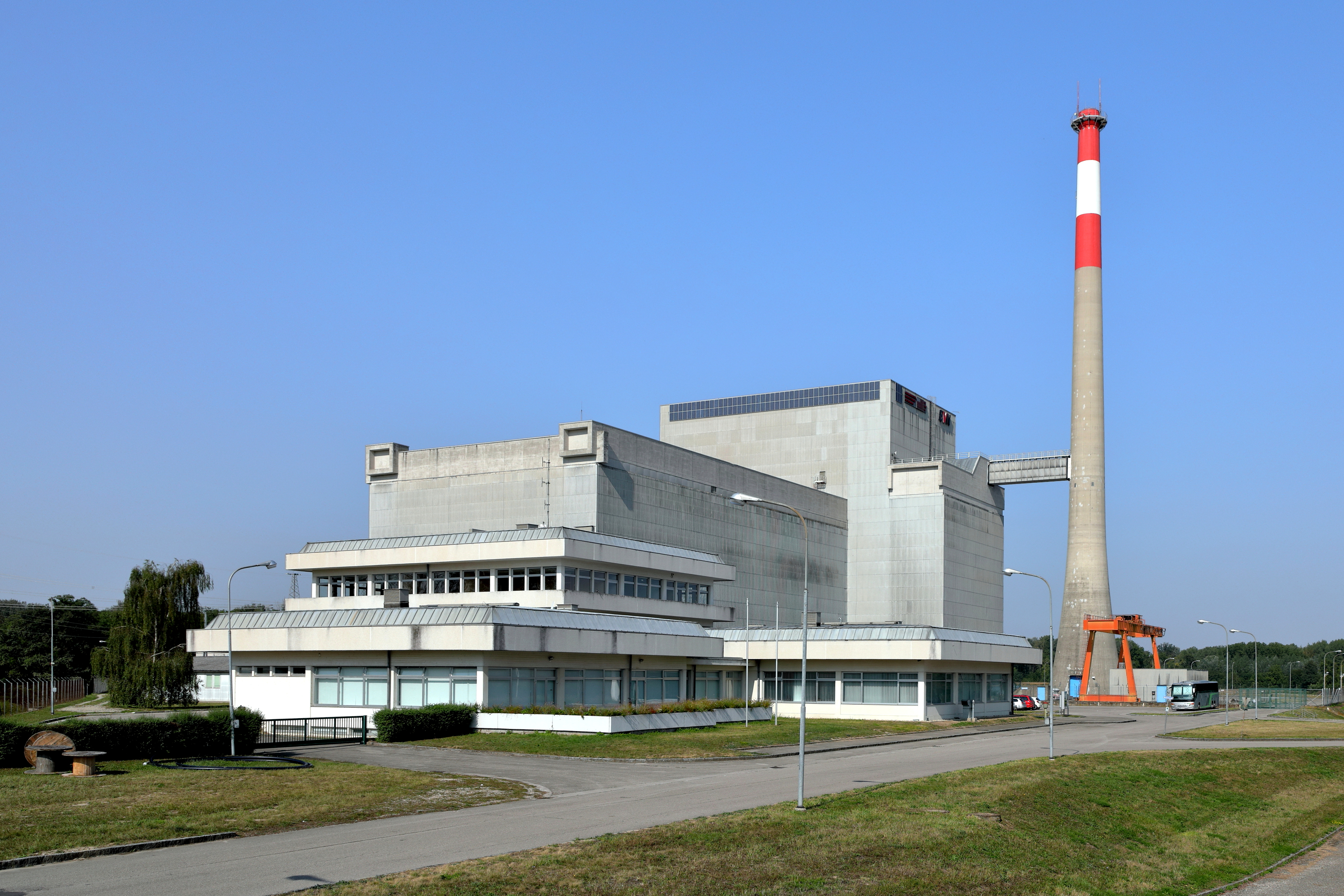
The Zwentendorf Nuclear Power Plant

The Zwentendorf Nuclear Power Plant was the first commercial nuclear plant for electric power generation built in Austria, of three nuclear plants originally envisioned. Construction of the plant at Zwentendorf was finished but the plant never entered service. The start-up of the Zwentendorf plant, as well as the construction of the other two plants, was prevented by a referendum on 5 November 1978, in which a narrow majority of 50.47% voted against the start-up.

Construction of the plant began in April 1972, as a boiling-water reactor rated at 692 megawatts electric power output. It was built by a joint venture of several Austrian electric power companies. The initial cost of the plant was around 5.2 billion Austrian schilling, approximately 1.4 billion euros adjusted for inflation. The ventilation stack chimney of the plant is 110 metres tall. Since the plebiscite, the plant has been partially deconstructed. The Dürnrohr Power Station was built nearby as a replacement thermal power station.

Following the 1978 referendum, no commercial nuclear power plant (built for the purpose of producing electricity) ever went into operation in Austria. In 1978, Austria enacted a law prohibiting the construction and operation of fission reactors for electrical power generation, hence the plant nowadays is used for research purposes. Three small nuclear reactors for scientific purposes were built in the 1960s, and only one of these plants is still being operated.

== Current use ==
The plant was purchased by Austrian energy company EVN Group in 2005; it is used as a security training centre and leased for filming, photography, and other events. In 2025, it will be used as the training ground for ENRICH European Robotics Hackathon.

In association with the Technical University Vienna, a research center (the Photovoltaik-Forschungszentrum Zwentendorf) was founded at the site. The research center is equipped with a 190 kW photovoltaic system consisting of two modules with solar tracking assemblies.

The plant is used for operator training by Kraftwerksschule e.V. The current operator of the plant also allows visits to the complex.

== Cultural uses ==
The Zwentendorf Nuclear Power Plant has been leased out over the years as a film location for films including Grand Central, Tag der Wahrheit, Restrisiko, and Hacking at Leaves.

In 2013, Swedish jazz improviser and composer Martin Küchen experimented with the station's reverberation while playing the saxophone.

From 2012 to 2014, the site was the venue of the Tomorrow Festival at the end of May and beginning of June.

In 2017, the first Shutdown Festival, an outdoor hardstyle and hardcore music festival, was held around the power plant. In 2019, the third edition took place with 15,000 visitors. After a COVID-19-related pause, about 13,000 people attended the fourth edition on 7 August 2021. The 2022 event was sold out with 15,000 visitors.

== Gallery ==
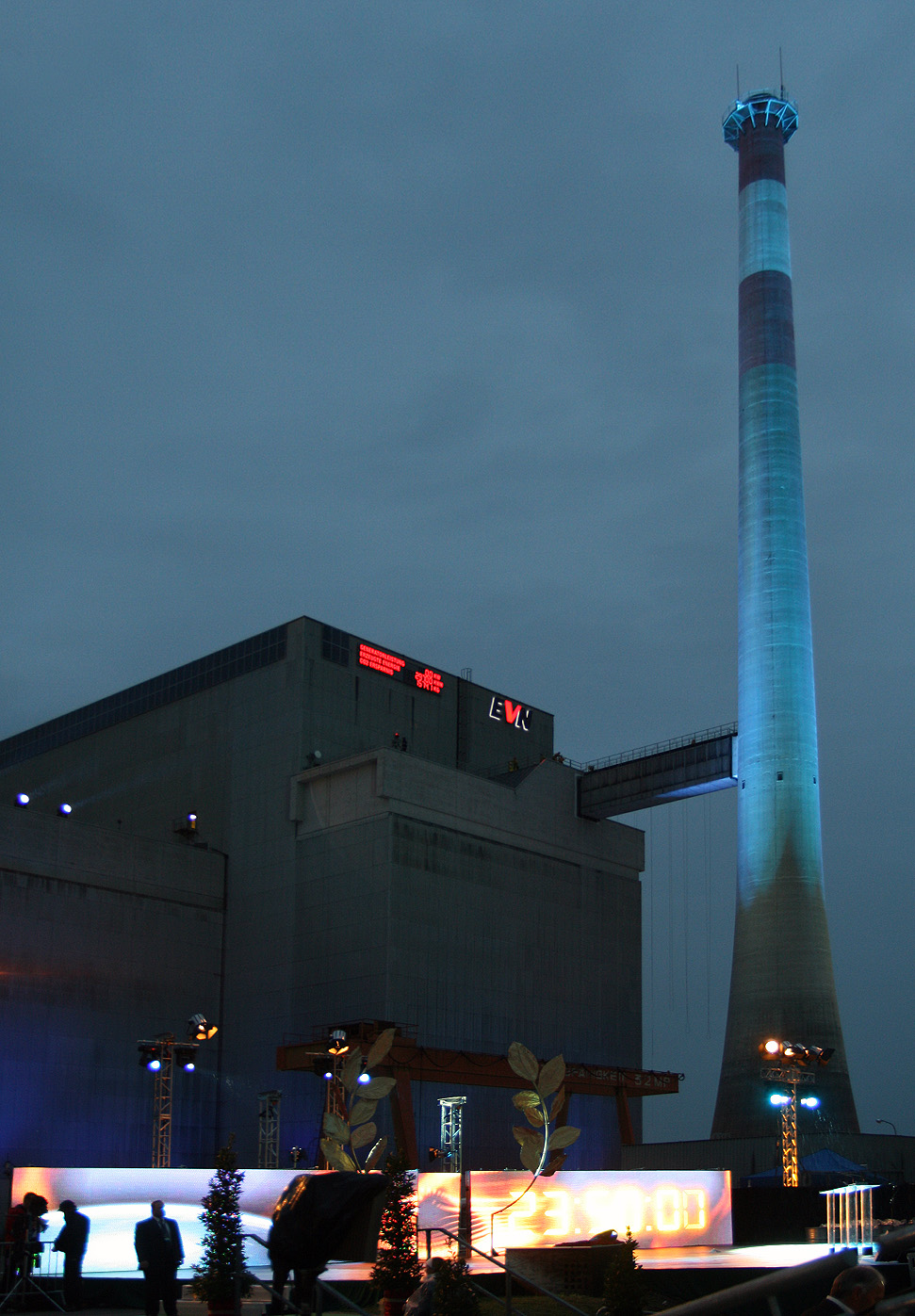
The Zwentendorf Nuclear Power Plant during the Save the World Awards in 2009

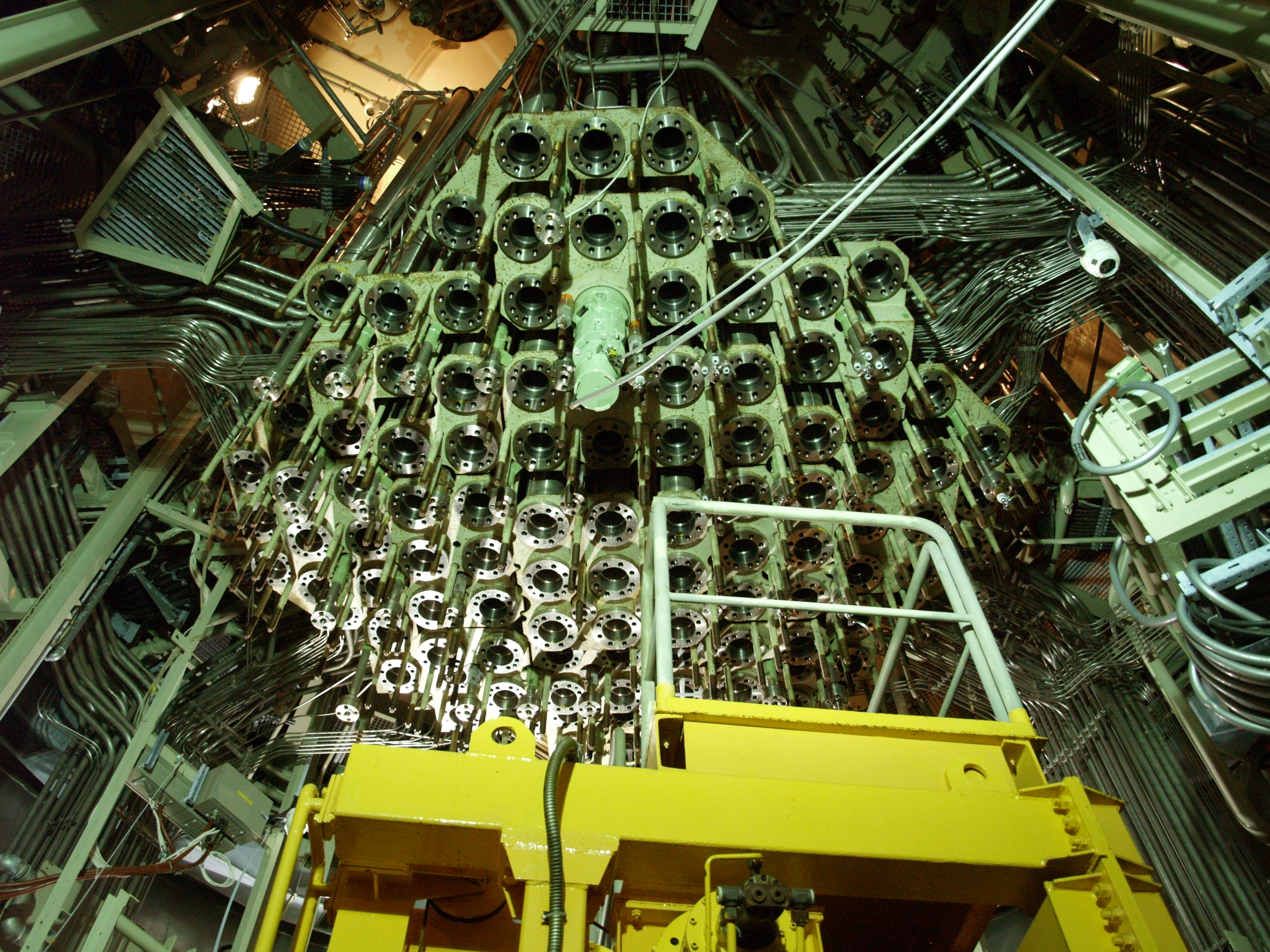
Control rod mechanism on the bottom of the reactor pressure vessel of the Zwentendorf Nuclear Power Plant

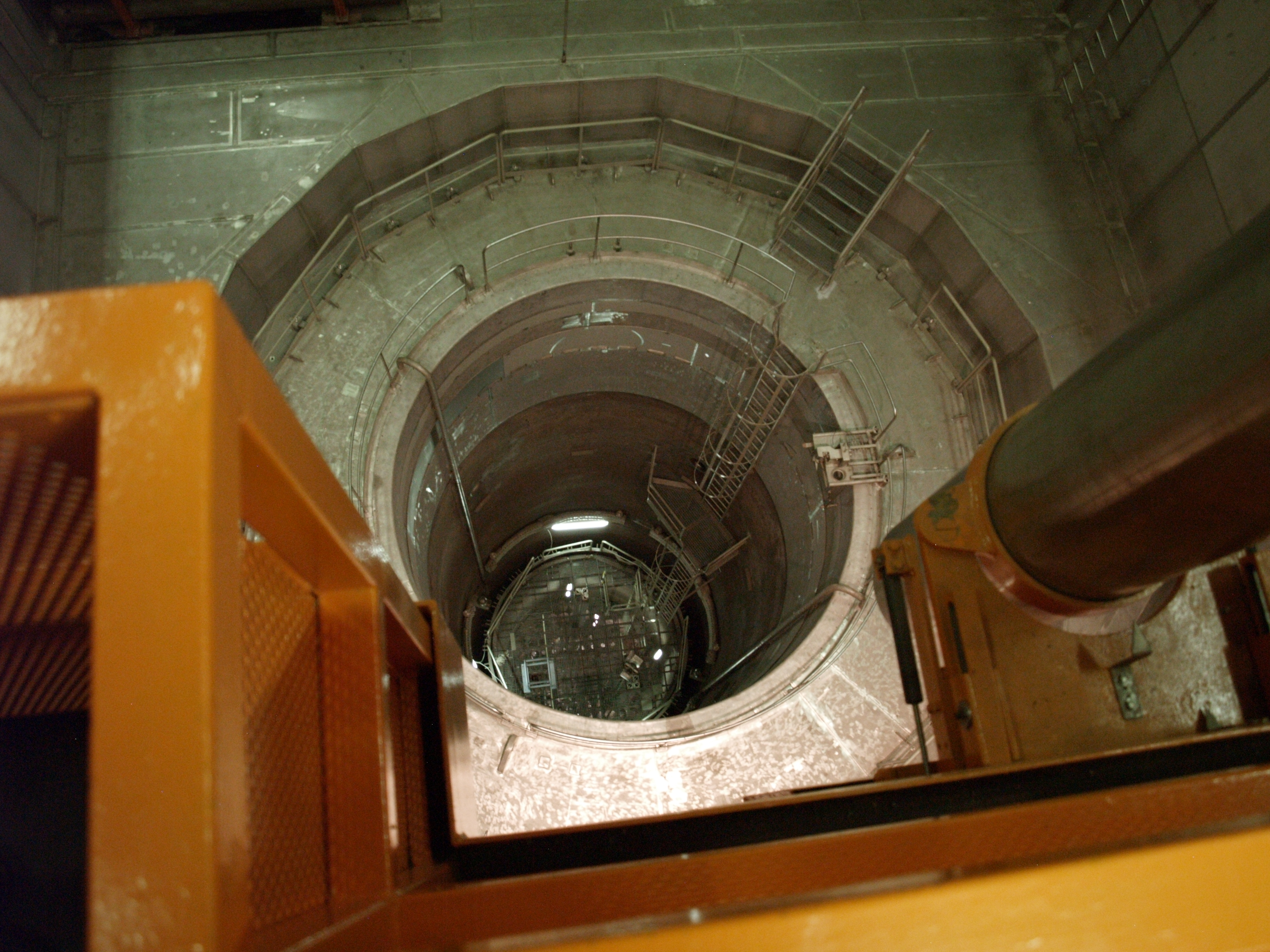
View into the reactor pressure vessel

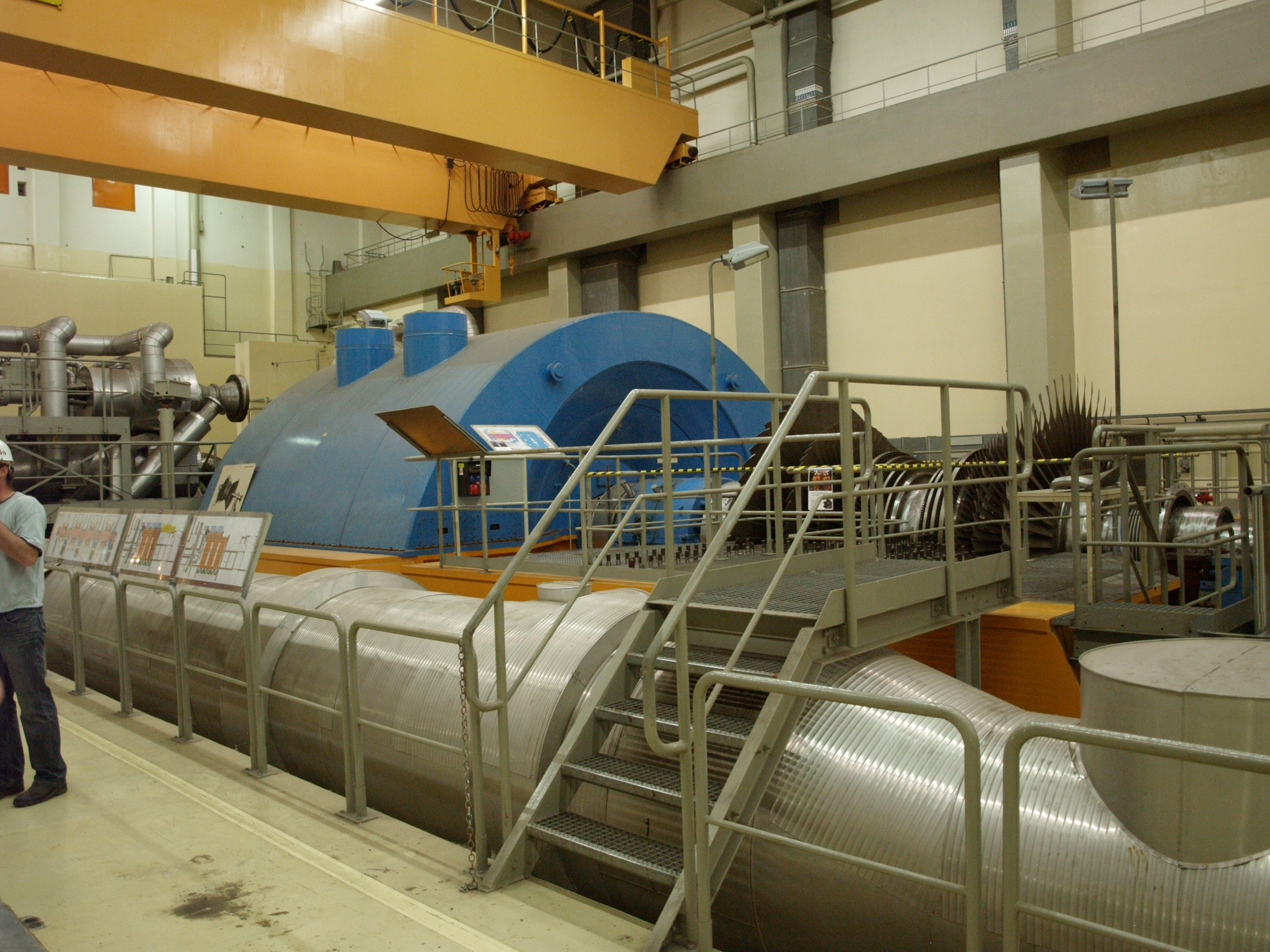
Low pressure turbines

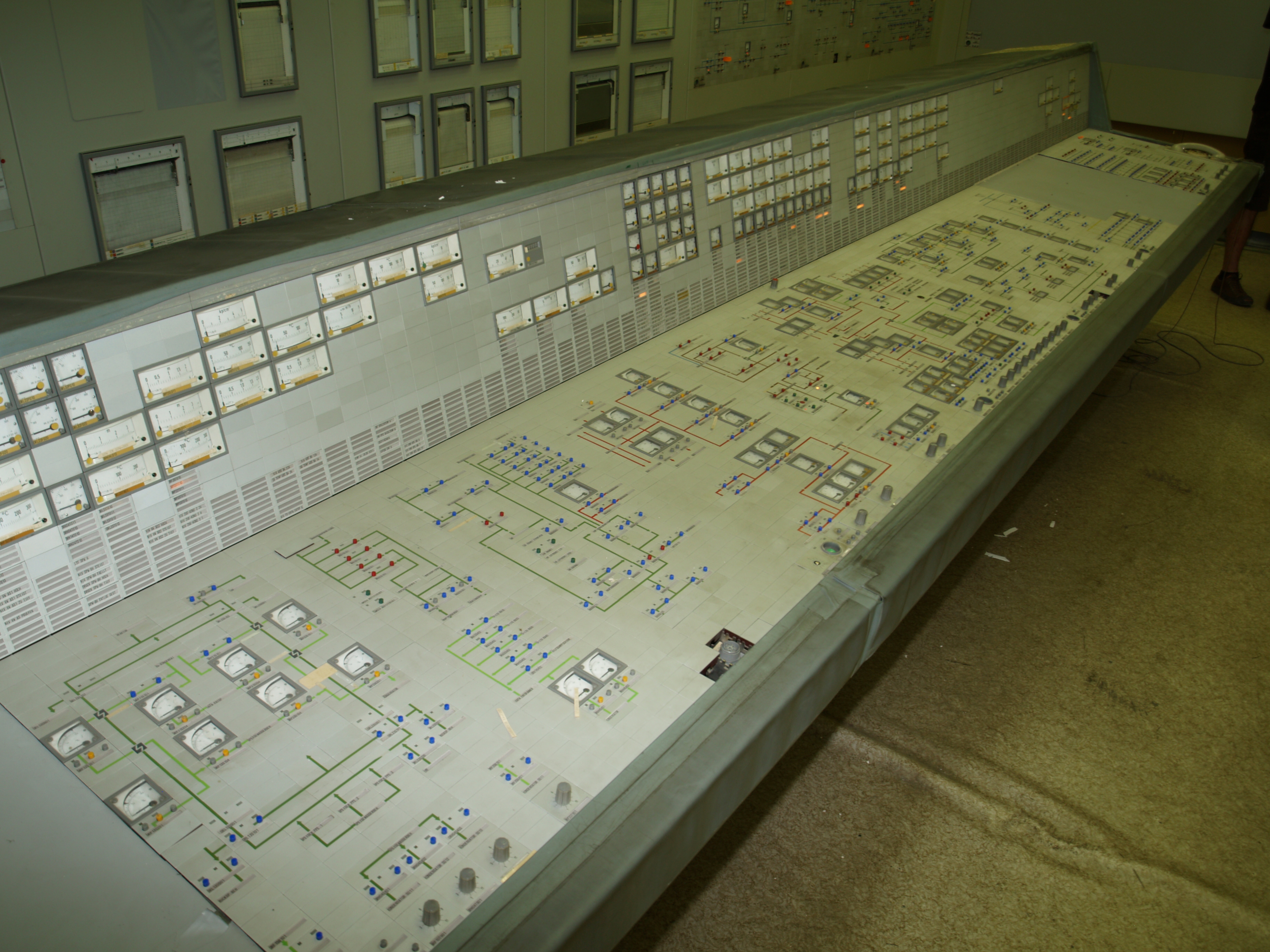
Control panel in the control room of the plant

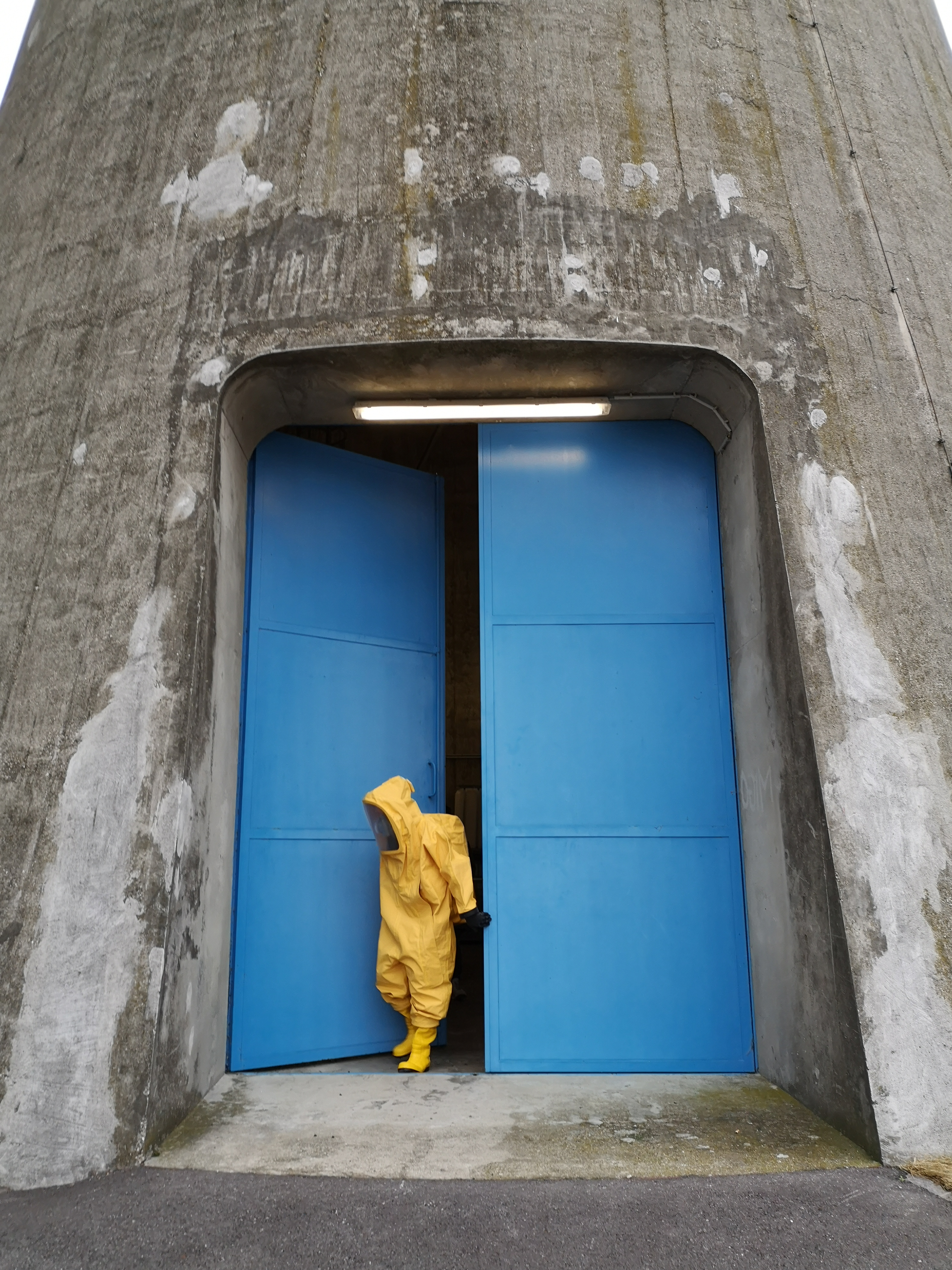
Door to chimney of the power station (behind-the-scenes image from the 'Hacking at Leaves' film shoot, 2020)

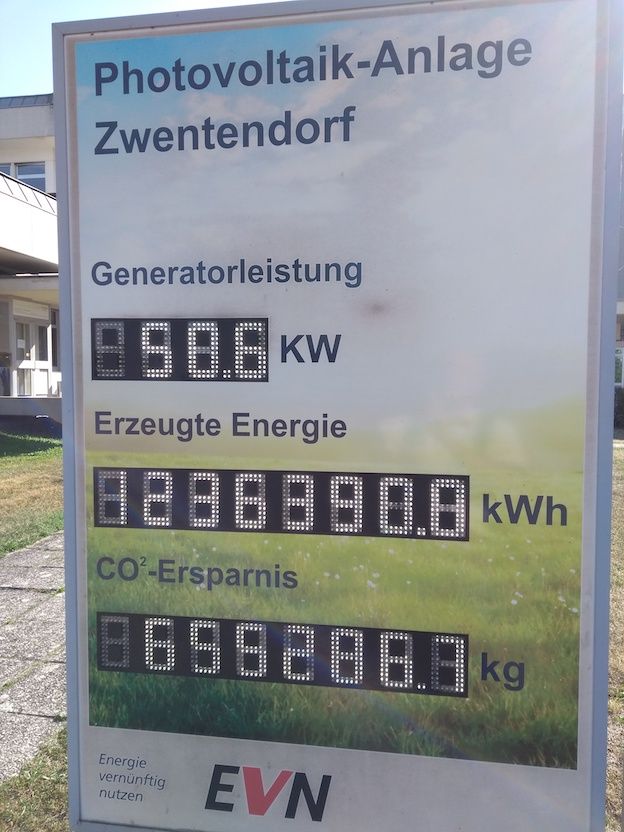
Real-time display of the power generated by the photovoltaic plant at Zwentendorf

== See also ==
- Anti-nuclear movement in Austria
- Freda Meissner-Blau
- Frieda Berryhill
- Nuclear power phase-out
