= Janette Sherman =

American physician (1930–2019)

Janette Dexter Sherman (née Miller; 10 July 1930 – 7 November 2019) was a physician, toxicologist, author, and activist in the U.S. She researched pesticides, nuclear radiation, birth defects, breast cancer, and illnesses caused by toxins in homes and was a pioneer in the field of occupational and environmental health. Sherman was an expert witness or consultant in 5,000 workers' compensation cases about deadly chemicals, contaminated water, and toxic pesticides.

In the 1970s, during her practice of internal medicine in Detroit, she recognized common profiles in patients that became the basis of a campaign against, lawsuits regarding, and clinical research that established the occupational source of illnesses among her patients in the automobile industry and led to the development of regulations for greater protection of the workers and the banning of certain chemicals from the workplace. Among the largest collections of medical-legal files in the United States, her records are preserved at the National Library of Medicine at the National Institutes of Health in Bethesda, Maryland. She was an oncology professor at Wayne State University.

== Biography ==
Janette Dexter Miller was born in Buffalo, New York to Wilma and Frank Miller, both of whom were pharmacists. After her parents divorced, she lived with her mother in Warsaw, New York. A 1952 graduate of Western Michigan College of Education (now Western Michigan University), Sherman studied biology and chemistry. She married her first husband, John Bigelow, that same year and moved with him to the San Francisco area while he served there in the navy. Sherman worked as a researcher at the University of California, Berkeley Radiation Laboratory, now the Lawrence Berkeley National Laboratory.

She was one of only six women in her graduating class at medical school, which she attended on the advice of a boss at the Naval Radiological Defense Laboratory at Hunters Point. She was graduated from the Medical School at Wayne State University in 1964.

She authored Chemical Exposure and Disease: Diagnostic and Investigative Techniques (1988) and Life’s Delicate Balance: Causes and Prevention of Breast Cancer (2000) and is the editor of Chernobyl: Consequences of the Catastrophe for People and the Environment (2007).

== Personal ==
Dr. Sherman was married three times, to John Bigelow in 1952, to Howard Sherman in 1965, and in 1987, to her high school sweetheart, Donald Nevinger, who died in 2005. She had two children, Connie Bigelow and Charles Bigelow, two stepchildren, Kevin Nevinger and Donna Kellogg, and five grandchildren.

In 1986, she took up the cello and eventually played with an all-volunteer symphony orchestra in McLean, Virginia for several years.

== Death ==
She died on 7 November 2019, at the age of 89, at an assisted-living center in Alexandria, Virginia. She had dementia and Addison's disease.
