= Ulrich Brand =

German political scientist (born 1967)

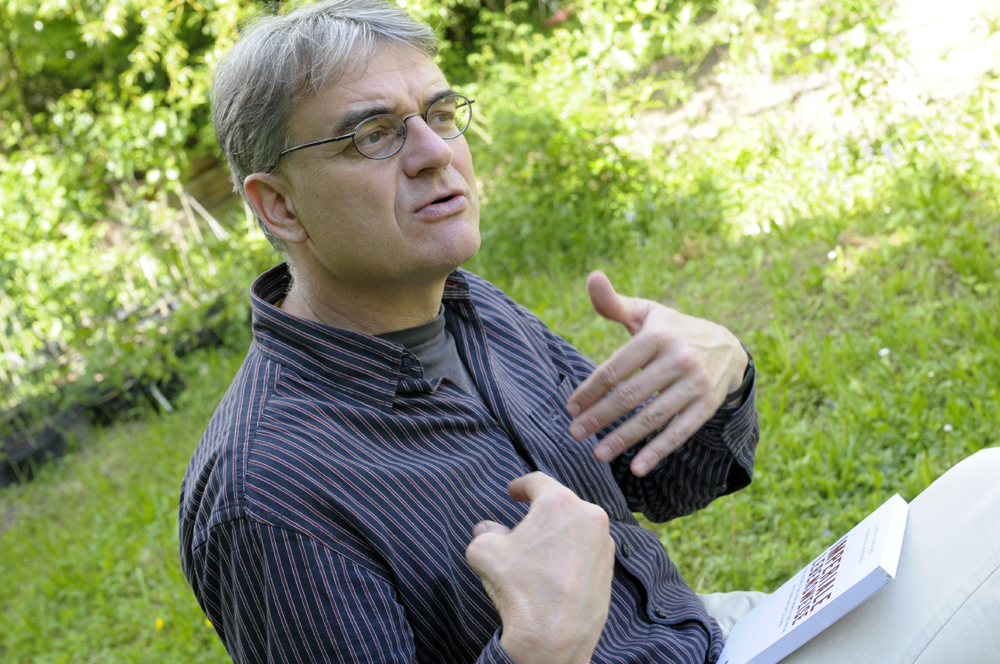
Brand in May 2017

Ulrich Brand (born April 15, 1967 in Mainau) is a German political scientist. Since September 2007 he has been a professor of International Politics at the University of Vienna.

== Biography ==
In 1989, Ulrich Brand graduated from Business Administration Studies with a specialisation in tourism at the Berufsakademie Ravensburg with a diploma. Between 1989 and 1996 he studied political science (with a minor in economics) at the Goethe University Frankfurt/Main and at the Universidad de Belgrano (Buenos Aires) as well as at the Universidad de Buenos Aires, finishing his studies also with a diploma. In 2000, Ulrich Brand completed his PhD in Political Science at Goethe University. Between 2001 and 2007 he worked as an assistant professor at the University of Kassel in the area of Globalisation and Politics. In 2006, Brand qualified with a habilitation (venia legendi) as a university lecturer with his thesis Die politische Form der Globalisierung. Soziale Kräfte und Institutionen im internationalisierten Staat ('The political form of globalisation. Social forces and institutions in the internationalised state').

Ulrich Brand is a member of the Board of Trustees of the Institut Solidarische Moderne, the Bundeskoordination Internationalismus (BUKO) and the scientific advisory board of the network Attac in Germany. Since 2011, he has been co-editor of Blätter für deutsche und internationale Politik, a monthly journal on topical political and economic issues published in Germany. Ulrich Brand is also member of the Österreichischen Gesellschaft für Politikwissenschaft (ÖGPW), Deutschen Vereinigung für Politische Wissenschaft (DVPW) and co-founder and member of Assoziation für kritische Gesellschaftsforschung (AkG). He is member of the permanent working group Alternatives to Development that has existed since 2011 and meets once a year in an Andean country.

Between 2012 and 2014 he was the head of the Department of Political Science at the University of Vienna, between 2016 and 2018 deputy head of the Department. Between 2011 and 2013 he was the academic director of the master study programme Interdisciplinary Latin American Studies. Currently, he is the academic director of the master study programme, Global Political Economy of Sustainable Development, that started in spring 2018. Since 2018 he also sits on the advisory board of the ZOE Institute for Future-fit Economies.

Ulrich Brand is a reviewer (among others) for: Antipode, Cambridge Journal of Economics, Environment & Planning C: Government & Policy, Environmental Politics, Environmental Values, Global Environmental Politics, Globalizations, Millennium: Journal of International Studies, Review of International Political Economy, Review of Ecological Economics, Peripherie. Zeitschrift für Politik und Ökonomie in der Dritten Welt, Third World Quarterly, and Zeitschrift für Internationale Beziehungen.

== Research ==
Brand's main research interests are the crisis of liberal globalisation and the internationalisation of the state, (global) social-ecological topics like resource politics and Green Economy, critical state and governance studies and Latin America. His theoretical work is part of discussions about critical state and hegemony theory (Antonio Gramsci, Nicos Poulantzas), regulation theory and political ecology. He has been working on a historical-materialist policy analysis (HMPA) for many years to combine different forms of policy analysis with materialist approaches. Up from 2018 he led a research project on trade unions and social-ecological transformation.

Ulrich Brand and Markus Wissen introduced the concept of the "imperial mode of living".

This concept refers to dominant patterns of production, distribution, and consumption that are deeply rooted in the everyday practices of the upper and middle classes of the global North, and increasingly in the emerging countries of the global South. The term attempts to answer the question how the specific mode of living in the Global North has caused diverse crisis phenomena but at the same time is globally attractive.

In times of 'multiple crises', the imperial mode of living contributes to securing social stability in the Global North. The negative consequences of the crises, especially in terms of ecology, are not noticeable yet, apart from weather extremes. At the same time, the imperial mode of living provides for a hegemonic orientation in many societies of the Global South. Beyond that, Brand and Wissen do research on the possibility of an alternative, "solidary", mode of living that has been appearing e.g. in struggles for energy democracy or food sovereignty and paves the way for a fundamental socio-ecological transformation.

== Published books (selected) ==
- Ulrich Brand and Markus Wissen: The Imperial Mode of Living. Everyday Life and the Ecological Crisis of Capitalism. Verso, London 2021, ISBN 978-1-78873-912-2.
- Alberto Acosta and Ulrich Brand: Radikale Alternativen. Warum man den Kapitalismus nur mit vereinten Kräften überwinden kann. Oekom, München 2018, ISBN 978-3-96238-014-4.
- Ulrich Brand and Markus Wissen: Imperiale Lebensweise. Zur Ausbeutung von Mensch und Natur in Zeiten des globalen Kapitalismus. Oekom, München 2017, ISBN 978-3-96006-843-3.
- Ulrich Brand and Helen Schwenken and Joscha Wullweber (Eds.): Globalisierung analysieren, kritisieren und verändern.Das Projekt Kritische Wissenschaft. VSA, Hamburg 2016, ISBN 978-3-89965-724-1.
- Lateinamerikas Linke. Ende des progressiven Zyklus? Eine Flugschrift. VSA, Hamburg 2016, ISBN 978-3-89965-700-5.
- Ulrich Brand and Roland Atzmüller, Joachim Becker, Lukas Oberndorfer, Vanessa Redak and Thomas Sablowski (Eds.): Fit für die Krise? Perspektiven der Regulationstheorie. Westfälisches Dampfboot, Münster 2013, ISBN 978-3-89691-925-0.
- Ulrich Brand and Bettina Lösch, Benjamin Opratko and Stefan Thimmel (Eds.): ABC der Alternativen 2.0. VSA, Hamburg 2012, ISBN 978-3-89965-500-1.
- Ulrich Brand and Isabell Radhuber and Almut Schilling-Vacaflor (Eds.): Plurinationale Demokration. Gesellschaftliche und staatliche Transformation in Bolivien. Westfälisches Dampfboot, Münster 2012, ISBN 978-3-89691-893-2.
- Ulrich Brand and Michael Löwy (Eds.): Globalisation et Crise Écologique. Une critique de l'économie politique par des écologistes allemands. Editions L'Harmattan, Paris 2012.
- Post-Neoliberalismus?: Aktuelle Konflikte und gegenhegemoniale Strategien. VSA, Hamburg 2011, ISBN 978-3-89965-424-0.
- Ulrich Brand and Eva Hartmann and Caren Kunze (Eds.): Globalisierung, Macht und Hegemonie: Perspektiven einer kritischen Internationalen Politischen Ökonomie. Westfälisches Dampfboot, Münster 2009, ISBN 978-3-89691-757-7.
- Globale Umweltpolitik und Internationalisierung des Staates: Biodiversitätspolitik aus strategisch-relationaler Perspektive. Westfälisches Dampfboot, Münster 2009, ISBN 978-3-89691-768-3.Gegen-Hegemonie. Perspektiven globalisierungskritischer Strategien. VSA, Hamburg 2005, ISBN 3-89965-116-2.
- Ulrich Brand and Christoph Görg, Karin Blank, Joachim Hirsch and Markus Wissen: Postfordistische Naturverhältnisse. Westfälisches Dampfboot, Münster 2003, ISBN 3-89691-540-1.
- Ulrich Brand and Werner Raza (Eds.): Fit für den Postfordismus? Theoretisch-politische Perspektiven des Regulationsansatzes. Westfälisches Dampfboot, Münster 2003, ISBN 3-89691-529-0.
- Ulrich Brand and Christoph Görg (Eds.): Mythen globalen Umweltmanagements. Rio + 10 und die Sackgassen "nachhaltiger Entwicklung". Westfälisches Dampfboot, Münster 2002, ISBN 3-89691-596-7 (Einsprüche 13).
- Ulrich Brand and Alex Demirović, Christoph Görg and Joachim Hirsch: Nichtregierungsorganisationen in der Transformation des Staates. Westfälisches Dampfboot, Münster 2001, ISBN 3-89691-493-6.
- Ulrich Brand and Achim Brunnengräber and Lutz Schrader: Global Governance. Alternative zur neoliberalen Globalisierung? Westfälisches Dampfboot, Münster 2000, ISBN 3-89691-471-5.
- Nichtregierungsorganisationen, Staat und ökologische Krise. Konturen kritischer NRO-Forschung. Das Beispiel der biologischen Vielfalt. Westfälisches Dampfboot, Münster 2000, ISBN 3-89691-473-1.
- Ulrich Brand and Ana E. Cecena (Eds.): Reflexionen einer Rebellion. "Chiapas" und ein anderes Politikverständnis. 2. Auflage. Westfälisches Dampfboot, Münster 2000, ISBN 3-89691-460-X.

== Recently published articles (in English, selected) ==
- Görg, Christoph/Brand, Ulrich (lead authors)/Haberl, Helmut/Hummel, Diana/Jahn, Thomas/Liehr, Stefan (2017): Challenges for Social-Ecological Transformations: Contributions from Social and Political Ecology. In: Sustainability 9(7), 1045; doi:10.3390/su9071045
- Brand, Ulrich/Boos, Tobias/Brad, Alina (2017): Degrowth and Post-Extractivism: Two Debates with Suggestions for the Inclusive Development Framework. In: Current Opinion in Environmental Sustainability 24, February, 36–41; doi.org/10.1016/j.cosust.2017.01.007
- Brand, Ulrich/Wissen, Markus (2017): The Imperial Mode of Living. In: Spash, Clive (ed.): Routledge Handbook of Ecological Economics: Nature and Society. London: Routledge, 152–161.
- Brand, Ulrich/Wissen, Markus (2017): Social-Ecological Transformation. In: Noel Castree, Michael Goodchild, Weidong Liu, Audrey Kobayashi, Richard Marston, Douglas Richardson (eds.): International Encyclopedia of Geography. People, the Earth, Environment, and Technology. Hoboken: Wiley-Blackwell/Association of American Geographers (forthcoming).
- Brand, Ulrich (2016): How to get out of the multiple crisis? Towards a critical theory of social-ecological transformation. In: Environmental Values 25(5), 503–525. http://dx.doi.org/10.3197/096327116X14703858759017
- Brand, Ulrich/Dietz, Kristina/Lang, Miriam (2016): Neo-Extractivism in Latin America – one side of a new phase of global capitalist dynamics In. Revista de Ciencia Política (Bogotá) 11(21), 125–159.
- Brand, Ulrich (2016): Post-Fordist Hybridization. A historical-materialist Approach to two modes of state transformation. In: Hurt, Shelley/Lipschutz, Ronnie (eds.): Hybrid Rule and State Formation: Public-Private Power in the 21st Century. London: Routledge, RIPE SERIES, 79–97.
- Brand, Ulrich (2016): “Transformation” as New Critical Orthodoxy. The Strategic Use of the Term “Transformation” Does Not Prevent Multiple Crisis. In: GAIA – Ecological Perspectives for Science and Society 25(1), 23–27. http://dx.doi.org/10.14512/gaia.25.1.7; Award: Second best paper of the journal in 2016
- Brand, Ulrich (2016): Post-neoliberalism. In: Springer, Simon/Birch, Kean/MacLeavy, Julie (eds.): Handbook of Neoliberalism. London: Routledge, 569–577.
- Brand, Ulrich (2015): Green Economy, Green Capitalism and the Imperial Mode of Living: Limits to a Prominent Strategy, Contours of a Possible New Capitalist Formation. In: Fudan Journal of Humanities and Social Sciences doi:10.1007/s40647-015-0095-6
- Brand, Ulrich/Lang, Miriam (2015): Entry “Green Economy”. In: Pattberg, Philipp/Zelli, Fariborz (eds.): Encyclopedia of Global Environmental Politics and Governance. Cheltenham/Northampton: Edward Elgar, 461–469.
- Bieling, Hans-Jürgen/Brand, Ulrich (2015): Competitiveness or Emancipation? Rethinking Regulation and (Counter-)Hegemony in Times of Capitalist Crisis. In: Westra, Richard/Badeen, Denis/Albritton, Robert (eds.): The Future of Capitalism After the Financial Crisis: The Varieties of Capitalism Debate in the Age of Austerity. London: Routlegde: Frontiers of Political Economy Series, 184–204.
