= 1978 Austrian nuclear power referendum =

| 5 November 1978 |
- Should the legislative resolution of the National Council of 7 July 1978 on the peaceful use of nuclear energy in Austria (commissioning of the Zwentendorf nuclear power plant) become law?
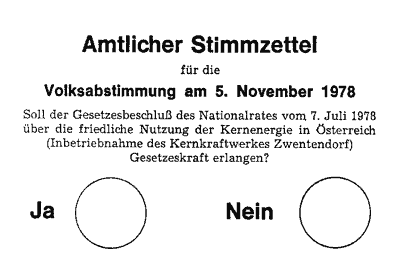
- Official ballot paper for the referendum

Results
| Choice | Votes | % |
|---|---|---|
| Yes | 1,576,709 | 49.53% |
| No | 1,606,777 | 50.47% |
| Valid votes | 3,183,486 | 97.67% |
| Invalid or blank votes | 75,996 | 2.33% |
| Total votes | 3,259,482 | 100.00% |
| Registered voters/turnout | 5,083,779 | 64.12% |
- Results by state

A referendum on the use of nuclear power was held in Austria on 5 November 1978. Voters were asked whether they approved a law allowing the peaceful use of nuclear power, particularly relating to the start-up of the Zwentendorf Nuclear Power Plant. Voters narrowly rejected it, with 50.5% voting against. As a result, although the Power Plant was finished, it never operated and has been repurposed for various projects over the years.

Voter turnout was 64%.

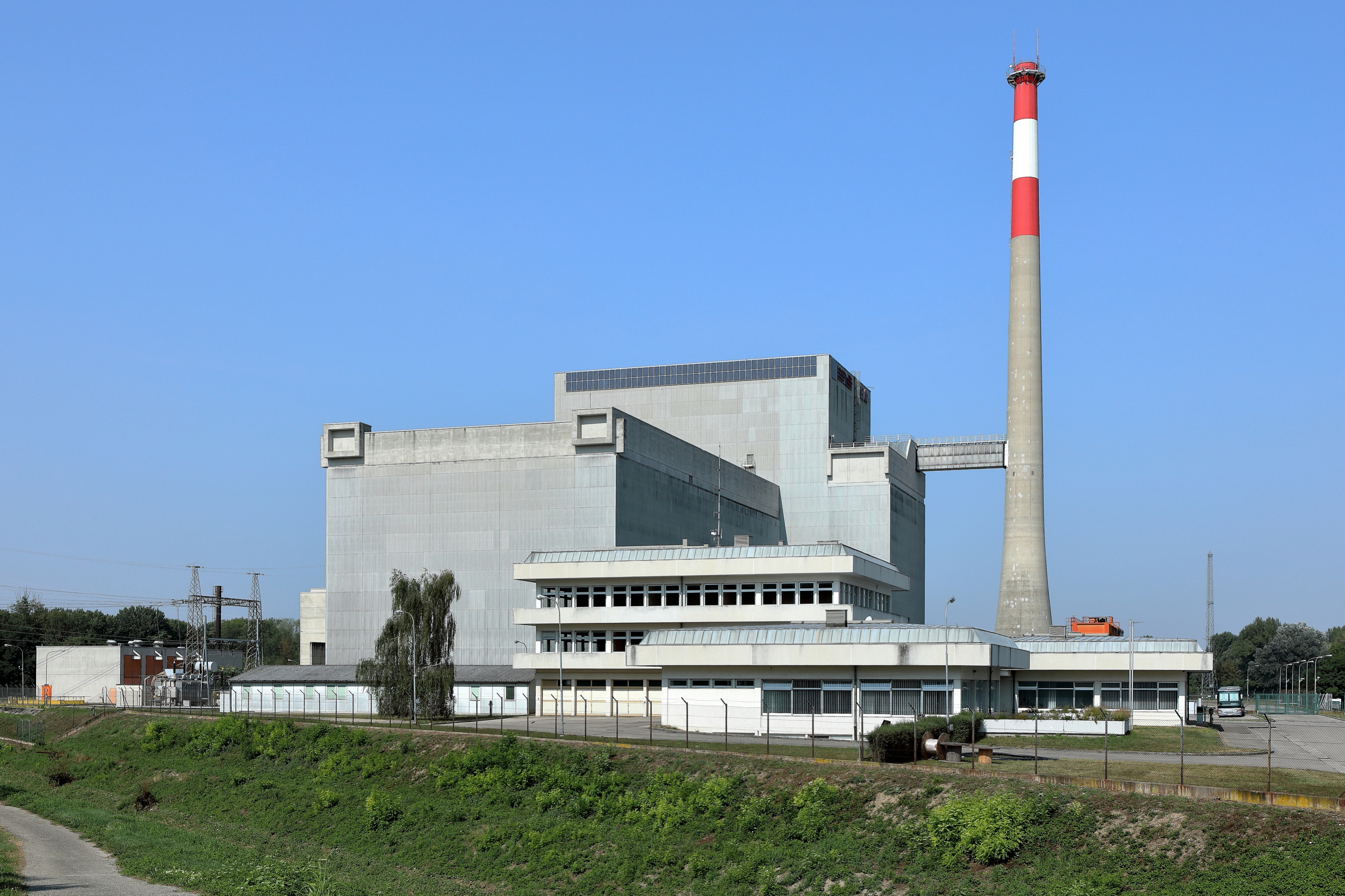
Zwentendorf power plant

== Results ==
| Choice | Votes | % |
|---|---|---|
| For | 1,576,709 | 49.53 |
| Against | 1,606,777 | 50.47 |
| Total | 3,183,486 | 100.00 |
| Valid votes | 3,183,486 | 97.67 |
| Invalid/blank votes | 75,996 | 2.33 |
| Total votes | 3,259,482 | 100.00 |
| Registered voters/turnout | 5,083,779 | 64.12 |
Source: Austrian Ministry of the Interior

=== By state ===
| State | Choice | Valid votes | For | | Against | |
| State | Choice | Valid votes | Votes | % | Votes | % |
|---|---|---|---|---|---|---|
| Burgenland | 187,879 | 124,384 | 74,377 | 59.8 | 50,007 | 40.2 |
| Carinthia | 355,219 | 217,911 | 117,481 | 54.1 | 100,070 | 45.9 |
| Lower Austria | 964,048 | 672,154 | 341,831 | 50.8 | 330,323 | 49.2 |
| Upper Austria | 809,904 | 537,965 | 254,337 | 47.3 | 282,628 | 52.3 |
| Salzburg | 277,141 | 165,523 | 71,576 | 43.2 | 93,947 | 56.8 |
| Styria | 793,746 | 452,423 | 238,851 | 52.8 | 213,572 | 47.2 |
| Tirol | 355,164 | 156,160 | 53,357 | 34.2 | 102,803 | 65.8 |
| Vorarlberg | 169,065 | 126,779 | 19,731 | 15.6 | 107,048 | 84.4 |
| Vienna | 1,171,613 | 730,187 | 404,808 | 55.4 | 325,379 | 44.6 |
| Total | 5,083,779 | 3,183,486 | 1,576,709 | 49.5 | 1,606,777 | 50.5 |
