= Bohr family =

Danish family of scientists, scholars and amateur sportsmen

The Bohr family is a Danish family of scientists, scholars and amateur sportsmen. The most famous members are Niels Bohr, physicist and winner of the Nobel Prize in Physics in 1922, Aage Bohr, son of Niels, also a physicist and in 1975 also received the Nobel Prize and Harald Bohr, mathematician and brother of Niels.

Christian Bohr, a physiologist and professor of physiology, was born to Henrik Georg Christian Bohr. Christian Bohr married Ellen Adler Bohr, the daughter of David Baruch Adler. They had 3 children:

- Niels Bohr, a physicist and winner of Nobel Prize in Physics in 1922. Niels married Margrethe Nørlund Bohr, an editor and transcriber, and sister to Niels Erik Nørlund, a mathematician. Niels had 6 children, all sons. The oldest, Christian Bohr, died in a boating accident in 1934, and another, Harald, was severely mentally disabled, died at the age of about 10/11. Remaining four sons were:
  - Aage Bohr became a physicist like his father and was awarded Nobel Prize in Physics in 1975.
    - Vilhem Bohr, Aage's son, is a physiologist affiliated to University of Copenhagen and the National Institute on Aging of the USA.
      - Eliot Bohr, a PhD fellow at Niels Bohr Institute, is an experimental physicist working in the field of atomic, molecular, and optical physics. He was also awarded the golden record for producing "I KNOW" for YoungBoy Never Broke Again
    - Tomas Bohr is also a physicist and professor of Biophysics at the Technical University of Denmark.
  - Hans Bohr, a physician and professor.
    - Henrik Bohr is a senior researcher at Technical University of Denmark.
  - Erik Bohr, an engineer.
  - Ernest Bohr, a lawyer and field hockey player who participated in the 1948 Olympics in London.
- Harald Bohr, a mathematician and footballer. He played for Denmark at Olympics 1908, winning the silver medal. Harald married Ulla Bohr (née Borregaard).
  - Ole Bohr (1922-2022). Ole married Jonna Bohr (née Siesby).
  - Ellen Følner (née Bohr). Ellen married the mathematician Erling Følner.
- Jennifer "Jenny" Bohr

== Involvement in Sports ==
Niels and Harald played as footballers, and the two brothers played a number of amateur matches for the Copenhagen-based Akademisk Boldklub, with Niels in goal and Harald in defence. There is, however, no truth in the oft-repeated claim that Niels emulated Harald by playing for the Denmark national team. Ernest Bohr was a 1948 Olympic field hockey player.
