= Anthony L. Turkevich =

American radiochemist (1916–2002)

Anthony Leonid Turkevich
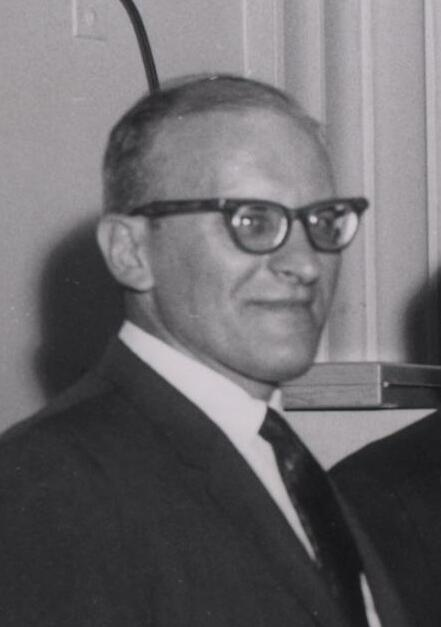
- Turkevich in 1962
- Born: July 23, 1916; Manhattan, New York, USA
- Died: September 7, 2002 (aged 86); Lexington, Virginia, USA
- Education: Dartmouth College (B.S.); Princeton University (Ph.D)
- Awards: E. O. Lawrence Award (1962); Atoms for Peace Award (1969)
- Scientific career
- Fields: Radiochemistry

Anthony Leonid Turkevich (July 23, 1916 – September 7, 2002) was an American radiochemist who was the first to determine the composition of the Moon's surface using an alpha scattering spectrometer on the Surveyor 5 mission in 1967.

== Early life and education ==
Turkevich was born on July 23, 1916, in Manhattan, New York, at the bishop's house attached to Saint Nicholas Russian Orthodox Cathedral. His father, Leonid Turkevich, was dean at the time, and later became the Metropolitan of the Orthodox Church in North America. He had two brothers. Turkevich studied at Dartmouth College and obtained his bachelor's degree in chemistry in 1937. He completed his Ph.D. at Princeton University on the structure of small molecules in 1940.

== Career ==
Turkevich moved to the Department of Physics at the University of Chicago as a research assistant with Robert Mulliken where he studied molecular spectroscopy and nuclear fission products.

In 1942, during World War II, he joined the Manhattan Project, working initially at Columbia University. The Columbia laboratory group was asked to move to Chicago as part of the project and from 1943 to 1945 he worked at the Metallurgical Laboratory or "Met Lab", at the University of Chicago. He investigated the separation of uranium isotopes by gaseous diffusion of uranium hexafluoride and the radiochemistry of reactor products, such as plutonium, that are generated by neutron capture in uranium. In 1945, he transferred to Los Alamos, and was involved with the Trinity test, the first detonation of a nuclear device, near Alamogordo, New Mexico, on July 16, 1945. Turkevich was one of several scientists who estimated the amount of energy released in the explosion. He then transferred to Edward Teller's theory group to study nuclear fusion and establish whether producing a thermonuclear weapon was feasible, one of many challenges faced by scientists at Los Alamos that led to the development and use of the Monte Carlo method. He worked with Nicholas Metropolis and Stanley Frankel using the ENIAC computer.

Turkevich returned to the Department of Chemistry at the University of Chicago as an assistant professor in 1946. In July 1946, Turkevich and Seymour Katcoff suggested that nuclear explosions could be monitored by measuring the atmospheric concentration of the radioactive isotope krypton-85, a fission product. Turkevich wrote a letter to Philip Morrison proposing that atmospheric sampling could be used to estimate the number of fissions that had occurred in nuclear reactors and atmospheric atom bomb tests. The history of this aspect of Turkevich's work didn't become public until it was declassified in 1997.

He also worked on the peaceful uses of nuclear energy. For this latter work, he received the 1969 Atoms for Peace Award.

== Personal life ==
Turkevich married Ireene ("Renee") in September 1948. They had a son and a daughter. Turkevich had two brothers. His elder brother, John Turkevich (1907 – 1998), was Eugene Higgins Professor of Chemistry at Princeton, and his younger brother, Nicholas L. Turkevich (1918 – 2007), was an international advertising executive. Anthony Turkevich died on September 7, 2002, in Lexington, Virginia, aged 86.
