= Headhunters (TV series) =

- Genre: Drama
- Created by: Doug Lucie
- Written by: Doug Lucie
- Directed by: Simon Langton
- Starring: James Fox; Francesca Annis; James Fleet; Eleanor David; Andrew Woodall
- Composer: Patrick Gowers
- Country of origin: United Kingdom
- Original language: English
- No. of series: 1
- No. of episodes: 3

Production
- Executive producer: Bill Bryden
- Producer: Andy Park
- Production locations: London, England, UK
- Cinematography: Ken Westbury
- Editor: David Harvie
- Running time: 50 minutes
- Production company: BBC Scotland

Original release
- Network: BBC1
- Release: 16 January – 30 January 1994

Headhunters is a British television drama miniseries, written and created by Doug Lucie, that first broadcast on BBC1 from 16 to 30 January 1994, and ran for three weeks on Sunday nights. The series, directed by Simon Langton, stars James Fox as Simon Hall is a partner in a firm of recruitment consultants. Troubles at work and at home lead him to question the values and morality of the business in which he has been so successful.

The series co-starred Francesca Annis, James Fleet, Eleanor David and Andrew Woodall.

== Cast ==
- James Fox as Simon Hall
- Francesca Annis as Sally Hall
- James Fleet as Alan Spence
- Eleanor David as Barbara Levy
- Andrew Woodall as Rupert Fuller
- Alan David as Philip
- Jeremy Child as Roddy Metcalfe
- Jonathan Cullen as Martin Lloyd
- Pippa Haywood as Antonia Watkins
- Amanda Royle as Emma Schulman
- Rupert Vansittart as Michael Best
- Tony Doyle as Bob McCauley
- Saul Reichlin as Howard Levy
- Danny Webb as Roger Garrison
- Serena Scott Thomas as Miranda
- Alex Norton as Sammy

== Episodes ==
No.	Title	Directed by	Written by	Original release date
1	"The Golden Hello"	Simon Langton	Doug Lucie	16 January 1994
Simon Hall is a head-hunter, and the best in the business. If the price is high enough, he can poach the most powerful businessmen and land them on the payroll of their rivals. The go-between's rewards are high: a town house, a country cottage, a beautiful wife and two children at boarding school. But Hall's life is falling apart. His wife, Sally, is forging her own career as a "sex and shopping" novelist and thinking of leaving home. And the trail of suffering that he's left in his professional life seems to be catching up with him.
2	"Maradona Land"	Simon Langton	Doug Lucie	23 January 1994
Hall is trapped in an agony of self-doubt as his misgivings about himself and his profession take a firmer grip on his psyche. Things get even worse when a business associate whom he has always considered more unscrupulous than himself, accuses him of causing terrible suffering to the people whose companies he raids. Hall's wife Sally is too wrapped up in her burgeoning fame to be concerned, but his young colleagues are becoming increasingly worried about his state of mind.
3	"Right as Rain"	Simon Langton	Doug Lucie	30 January 1994
When Sally Hall arrives home with her children, she finds the house wrecked and her husband Simon in a desperate state. Does he have either the inner toughness or the desire to make it in the headhunting game?

== Home media ==
- The series has never been re-broadcast or released on home video.
