= The Comedy of Errors (musical) =

Musical by Trevor Nunn and Guy Woolfenden

- Music: Guy Woolfenden
- Lyrics: Trevor Nunn
- Book: Trevor Nunn
- Basis: The Comedy of Errors by William Shakespeare
- Productions: 1976 Stratford-upon-Avon; 1976 West End
- Awards: Laurence Olivier Award for Best New Musical

The Comedy of Errors is a musical with a book and lyrics by Trevor Nunn and music by Guy Woolfenden. It is based on the William Shakespeare play, The Comedy of Errors, which had previously been adapted for the musical stage as The Boys from Syracuse by Richard Rodgers, Lorenz Hart and George Abbott in 1938. The London production won the Olivier Award for Best New Musical in 1977.

== Background ==
While enjoying a holiday in Ephesus, Antipholus and Dromio of Syracuse are mistaken for their long-lost twin brothers Dromio and Antipholus of Ephesus by Adriana, who is married to the latter. Certain her husband's wandering eye has noticed the many temptations awaiting him in town, she is determined to win back his undivided attention. Comic complications arise when she pursues the wrong Antipholus and tries to woo him home.

The theatre critic Irving Wardle said of the score, "It does not give you much to hum on the way out, but it supplies a springboard into dramatic song and dance." The original Royal Shakespeare Company production received generally good reviews and was described as "stylish, colorful, and rich in comic detail" by various critics. Michael Billington observed later that "at first the music, with its mock-Theodorakis numbers and Zorba-like dances, seemed to impede the farcical momentum. But by the time the production reached the Aldwych in 1977, text and music were perfectly integrated".

== Productions ==
The Royal Shakespeare Company production, directed by Nunn, choreographed by Gillian Lynne, and designed by John Napier, opened at the Royal Shakespeare Theatre in Stratford-upon-Avon on 29 September 1976. The cast included Mike Gwilym as Antipholus of Ephesus, Roger Rees as Antipholus of Syracuse, Nickolas Grace as Dromio of Ephesus, Michael Williams as Dromio of Syracuse, and Judi Dench as Adriana, with Francesca Annis, Richard Griffiths, Griffith Jones, and John Woodvine in supporting roles.

The production later transferred to the Aldwych Theatre in the West End in London, where it won the Laurence Olivier Award for Best New Musical in 1977.

Philip Casson directed a television production based on Nunn's concept for ITV. With most of the original cast, the programme was broadcast on 18 April 1978.

The Acting Company staged the musical at the Women's Project Theater in New York City in May 2001. It was directed by John Rando and choreographed by Joey McKneely. The production then toured the United States.

== Awards and nominations ==
=== Original London production ===
Year	Award	Category	Nominee	Result
1977	Laurence Olivier Award	Best New Musical		Won
