= Francesca Annis =

English actress (born 1945)

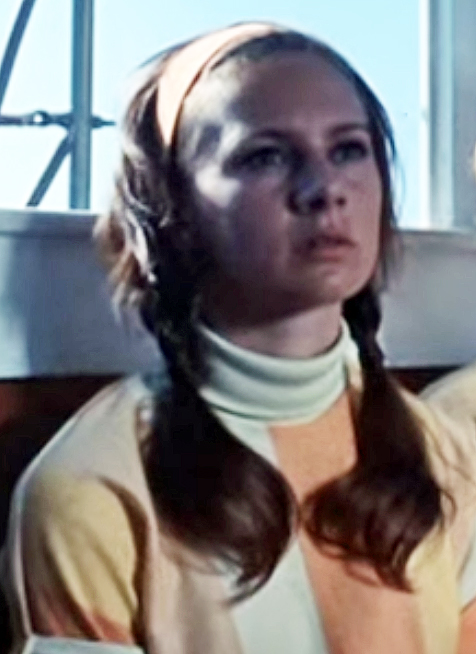
- Annis in the trailer for Flipper's New Adventure (1964)
- Born: 14 May 1945 (age 81); Kensington, London, England
- Occupation: Actress
- Years active: 1959–present
- Partner(s): Patrick Wiseman (1976–1997); Ralph Fiennes (1995–2006)
- Children: 3

Francesca Annis (born 14 May 1945) is an English actress. She is known for television roles in Agatha Christie's Partners in Crime (1983–84), Reckless (1998), Wives and Daughters (1999), Deceit (2000), and Cranford (2007). A six-time BAFTA TV Award nominee, she won the 1979 BAFTA TV Award for Best Actress for the ITV serial Lillie. Her film appearances include Macbeth (1971), Krull (1983), Dune (1984), The Debt Collector (1999), and The Libertine (2004).

== Early life and education ==
Annis was born in Kensington, London, in 1945, to an English father, Lester William Anthony Annis (1914–2001), and a Brazilian-French mother, Mariquita (Mara) Purcell (1913–2009). Both were sometime actors and Mara a sometime singer. Mara was from a wealthy Brazilian family. The Annises moved to Brazil when Francesca was one year old, and spent six years there, returning to England when she was seven. In recollecting the years in Brazil, she described her parents as running "a nightclub on Copacabana beach", and her mother Mara "performing as a blues singer".

Annis was educated at a convent school, and trained in her early years as a ballet dancer, with training in the Russian style at the Corona Stage Academy.

== Career ==
Annis began acting professionally in her teens, and made her film debut in The Cat Gang (1959). Her first major film role was as Elizabeth Taylor's handmaiden in Cleopatra (1963), in which she was cast at the age of 16 while still studying Russian ballet. Her big break was as one of the leads in the 1965 West End stage musical Passion Flower Hotel. She played Estella in a television adaptation of Great Expectations (1967) and presented children's television programmes. She garnered attention for her performance as Lady Macbeth in Roman Polanski's film version of Macbeth (1971) in which she performs the sleepwalking soliloquy nude. The critic Kenneth Tynan was present when the scene was shot:

"Francesca does it very sportingly and with no fuss ... though of course the set is closed, great curtains are drawn around the acting area ... and the wardrobe mistress rushes to cover Francesca with a dressing gown the instant Roman says, 'Cut'".

Annis played the "Widow of the Web" in the 1983 science fantasy film Krull, and starred as Lady Jessica in the 1984 David Lynch science fiction film Dune.

She appeared as Tuppence with James Warwick as Tommy Beresford in the pilot film The Secret Adversary (1983) and the subsequent TV series, Agatha Christie's Partners in Crime (1983–84). Annis played Jacqueline Kennedy in Onassis: The Richest Man in the World in 1988. She portrayed Mrs Wellington in the second film and directorial debut by Prince, Under the Cherry Moon (1986).

Annis pursued a stage career, playing leading roles with the Royal Shakespeare Company, such as Luciana in Trevor Nunn's musical version of The Comedy of Errors (1976) and Juliet in Romeo and Juliet alongside Ian McKellen (1976).

At the National Theatre in 1981, she played Natalya Petrovna in Peter Gill's production of Ivan Turgenev's A Month in the Country. At the Comedy Theatre between September 2005 and January 2006, Annis starred as Ruth in Epitaph for George Dillon with Joseph Fiennes. She returned to the stage in April 2009, to star as Mrs Conway in Rupert Goold's National Theatre revival of J. B. Priestley's Time and the Conways.

She appeared in television productions in the 1970s, 1980s and 1990s in series such as Edward the Seventh (1975) as Lillie Langtry, a role she reprised in Lillie (1978); Madame Bovary (1975); and Parnell and the Englishwoman (1991), in which she played Kitty O'Shea. She played a major role in J. C. Wilsher's police drama Between the Lines from 1993 to 1994, as well as the miniseries Reckless (1998) and its 2000 sequel. Annis co-starred with Sir Michael Gambon and Dame Judi Dench as Lady Ludlow (an aristocrat opposed to the education of the lower classes) in the BBC1 costume-drama series Cranford (2007). In 2015 and 2016, Annis played a leading role in the ITV drama Home Fires. In 2025, she starred as the "formidable matriarch" Ann in The Forsytes, a period drama broadcast in the UK on Channel 5. Annis also appeared in the 1980s mini series I'll Take Manhattan, adapted for screen from the Judith Krantz novel of the same name.

== Personal life ==
Annis was in a relationship with photographer Patrick Wiseman that began in 1974, raising three children, Charlotte, Taran, and Andreas. Annis began a relationship with Hamlet co-star Ralph Fiennes in 1995, ending her 23-year relationship with Wiseman in 1997; Fiennes in turn divorced his wife of four years, Alex Kingston. Annis is said to have "apologised to Wiseman" over their parting. Annis and Fiennes announced their separation on 7 February 2006, after 11 years together, in a parting described as "acrimonious," following rumours that he had had an affair with the Romanian singer Cornelia Crisan.

At age 64, in an interview with Tim Auld of The Telegraph in 2009, Annis described herself as being one who tends "to forget the bad things – I don't dwell on them. I think, 'Oh, f– it, life's too short'" and that although single, she believes "it is better to be with someone than alone," stating "I think you live a fuller life...to have someone else's input on anything – a book, a meal, your children, life, a walk – is fantastic" and expressing optimism as she looked to her future, stating "'I like to have a big open canvas. I am a glass-half-full person. Something will turn up, you know, and whatever it is, it'll be fine.'"

== Filmography ==
| Year | Title | Role | Notes |
|---|---|---|---|
| 1959 | The Cat Gang | Sylvia | |
| 1959 | Carry On Teacher | Schoolgirl | Uncredited role |
| 1960 | The Young Jacobites | Jean | 8-part film serial |
| 1960 | No Kidding | Priscilla | |
| 1960 | His and Hers | Wanda | Uncredited role |
| 1963 | Cleopatra | Eiras | |
| 1963 | West 11 | Phyl | |
| 1964 | Murder Most Foul | Sheila Upward | |
| 1964 | Saturday Night Out | Jean | |
| 1964 | Crooks in Cloisters | June | |
| 1964 | The Eyes of Annie Jones | Annie Jones | |
| 1964 | Flipper's New Adventure | Gwen | |
| 1965 | The Pleasure Girls | Sally | |
| 1966 | Run with the Wind | Jean Packer | |
| 1970 | The Sky Pirate | Uptight Girl | |
| 1970 | The Walking Stick | Arabella Dainton | |
| 1971 | Macbeth | Lady Macbeth | |
| 1973 | Penny Gold | Delphi / Diane | |
| 1974 | Big Truck and Sister Clare | Sister Clare | |
| 1983 | Krull | Widow of the Web | |
| 1984 | Dune | Lady Jessica | |
| 1986 | El rio de oro | Dubarry | |
| 1986 | Under the Cherry Moon | Mrs. Wellington | |
| 1990 | Romeo.Juliet | Juliet (voice) | Film-in-concert |
| 1999 | The Debt Collector | Val Dryden | |
| 1999 | Milk | Harriet | |
| 1999 | Onegin | Katiusha | Uncredited role |
| 2004 | The Libertine | Countess | |
| 2005 | Revolver | Lily Walker | |
| 2006 | Gweipo | Rebecca | Short film |
| 2008 | Shifty | Valerie | |
| 2015 | The Briny | Maureen | Short film |
| 2018 | King of Thieves | Lynn Reader | |
| 2024 | Hamlet | Ghost | Original title: Hamlet: Ian McKellen |

== Television ==
| Year | Title | Role | Notes |
|---|---|---|---|
| 1960 | BBC Sunday-Night Play | Anne Miller | (Episode: "The Wind and the Sun") |
| 1960 | Probation Officer | Judy Beale | (Series 2; Episode 16) |
| 1961 | The Afterthought | Elaine Coombes | Television film |
| 1961 | Stress Point | Lesley Gifford | Television film |
| 1961 | Harpers West One | Jenny Bates | (Series 1; Episode 7) |
| 1961 | Ghost Squad | Ethel Rice | (Episode: "High Wire") (Uncredited role) |
| 1961 | ITV Television Playhouse | Carla | (Series 7; Episode 8: "Children of the Sun") |
| 1962 | ITV Television Playhouse | Liz | (Series 8; Episode 8: "A Free Weekend") |
| 1962 | ITV Play of the Week | Margery Hamilton | (Series 8; Episode 1: "The Gentle Assassin") |
| 1962 | Sir Francis Drake | Princess Mariella | (Episode "Visit to Spain") |
| 1962 | Wednesday's Child | Vicky Lemming | Television film |
| 1963 | Drama 61-67 | Sally | (Episode: "Drama '63: 54 Minute Affair") |
| 1963 | Suspense | Ann, the Girl | (Episode: "Blackbird") |
| 1964 | Comedy Playhouse | Ann | (Episode: "The Mate Market") |
| 1964 | Dr. Finlay's Casebook | Fiona Senlac | (Episode: "A Present from Father") |
| 1964 | Love Story | Ruth Starr | (Episode: "A Girl Like Me") |
| 1964 | Armchair Theatre | Amy Racey | (Episode: "Old Soldiers") |
| 1964 | The Human Jungle | Mary | (Episode: "Wild Goose Chase") |
| 1964 | Danger Man | Judy | (Episode: "No Marks For Servility") |
| 1965 | Danger Man | Shiela | (Episode: "That's Two of Us Sorry") |
| 1965 | Alexander Graham Bell | Mabel Hubbard | (Mini-series; 5 episodes) |
| 1965 | Our Man at St. Mark's | Frances Harding | (Episode: "Four Hundred Years' Thick") |
| 1965 | Scott On... | Various | (Episode: "Food") |
| 1965 | ITV Play of the Week | Christine Burrows | (Series 10; Episode 25: "An Aspidistra in Babylon") |
| 1966 | ITV Play of the Week | Catherine | (Series 11; Episode 31: "A View from the Bridge") |
| 1966 | The Five-Nineteen | The Girl | Television film |
| 1966 | This Man Craig | Jane Brewer | (Episode: "The Romantic") |
| 1966 | The Saint | Maria Lopez | (Episode: "Locate and Destroy") |
| 1967 | Great Expectations | Estella | (7 episodes) |
| 1967 | No Hiding Place | Jenny | (Episode: "Cause for Alarm") |
| 1967 | The Golden Age | Anne | (Episode: "Women") |
| 1967 | BBC Play of the Month | Manuela von Meinhardis | (Series 3; Episode 1: "Girls in Uniform") |
| 1968 | Theatre 625 | Helen | (Episode: "Home Sweet Honeycomb") |
| 1968 | Ooh La La! | Christiane | (Episode: "Dear Lady") |
| 1968 | ITV Playhouse | Jill | (Series 2; Episode 12: "The Explorer") |
| 1969 | Heritage | Antigone | (2 episodes: "Antigone: Parts 1 & 2") |
| 1970 | ITV Saturday Night Theatre | Hilary | (Episode: "The Family Is a Vicious Circle") |
| 1971 | ITV Playhouse | Roxane | (Series 5; Episode 2: "The Chinese Prime Minister") |
| 1972 | Stage 2 | Solveig | (Episode: "Peer Gynt") |
| 1973 | A Pin to See the Peepshow | Julia Almond | (4 episodes) |
| 1973 | Orson Welles Great Mysteries | Nicole Zachary | (Episode: "Death of an Old-Fashioned Girl") |
| 1974 | Thriller | Tracy Conway | (Episode: "Sign It Death") |
| 1974 | ITV Playhouse | Elaine | (Series 7; Episode 9: "The Couch") |
| 1974 | BBC Play of the Month | Helen | (Series 10; Episode 3: "The Wood Demon") |
| 1975 | Madame Bovary | Emma Bovary | (Mini-series; 4 episodes) |
| 1975 | Edward the Seventh | Lillie Langtry | (Episodes 7: "Dearest Prince" and 8: "The Royal Quadrille") |
| 1977 | Play for Today | Kate Crowley | (Episode: "Stronger Than the Sun") |
| 1978 | Lillie | Lillie Langtry | (13 episodes) |
| 1978 | The Comedy of Errors | Luciana | Television film |
| 1980 | Why Didn't They Ask Evans? | Lady Frances "Frankie" Derwent | Television film |
| 1982 | Coming Out of the Ice | Galina | Television film |
| 1983 | Shades of Darkness | Catherine Frode | (Episode: "The Maze") |
| 1983–1984 | Agatha Christie's Partners in Crime | Prudence 'Tuppence' Cowley/Beresford | (11 episodes) |
| 1985 | Magnum P.I. | Penelope St. Clair | (Episode: "Deja Vu") |
| 1986 | Inside Story | Paula Croxley | (Mini-series; 6 episodes) |
| 1987 | I'll Take Manhattan | Lily Davina-Amberville | (Mini-series; 2 episodes) |
| 1988 | Onassis: The Richest Man in the World | Jacqueline Kennedy/Onassis | Television film |
| 1991 | Parnell and the Englishwoman | Katharine O'Shea | (Mini-series; 4 episodes) |
| 1991 | Performance | Elizabeth Collier | (Episode: "Absolute Hell") |
| 1991 | The Gravy Train Goes East | Katya Princip | (Mini-series; 4 episodes) |
| 1992 | Weep No More, My Lady | Leila | Television film |
| 1993 | Between the Lines | Angela Berridge | (8 episodes) |
| 1993 | A Haunting Harmony | David's Mother | Television film |
| 1994 | Headhunters | Sally Hall | (3 episodes) |
| 1994 | Doomsday Gun | Sophie | Television film |
| 1994 | Network First | Alexandra (voice) | (Documentary series; 2 episodes: "Nicholas and Alexandra - Parts 1 & 2") |
| 1996 | Dalziel and Pascoe | Bonnie Fielding | (Episode: "An Autumn Shroud") |
| 1996 | Tales from the Crypt | Sharon Bannister | (Episode: "A Slight Case of Murder") |
| 1997 | Deadly Summer | Celia Harcourt | Television film |
| 1997 | Reckless | Anna Fairley | (Mini-series; 6 episodes) |
| 1998 | Reckless: The Sequel | Anna Fairley | Television film |
| 1999 | Wives and Daughters | Hyacinth Gibson | (Mini-series; 4 episodes) |
| 2000 | Deceit | Ellen Richmond | (2 episodes) |
| 2002 | Copenhagen | Margrethe Bohr | Television film |
| 2005 | Jericho | Lady Clare Wellesley | (Mini-series; Episode: "A Pair of Ragged Claws") |
| 2006 | Jane Eyre | Lady Ingram | (Mini-series; 4 episodes) |
| 2007 | Agatha Christie's Marple | Lady Selina Hazy | (Episode: "At Bertram's Hotel") |
| 2007–2009 | Cranford | Lady Ludlow | (6 episodes) |
| 2009 | Return to Cranford | Lady Ludlow | (2-part Christmas Special) |
| 2010 | Playhouse: Live | (unknown) | (Episode: "Here") |
| 2010 | The Little House | Elizabeth | (2 episodes) |
| 2012 | Loving Miss Hatto | Joyce | Television film |
| 2015–2016 | Home Fires | Joyce Cameron | (11 episodes) |
| 2020 | Bancroft | Carol Bancroft | (2 episodes) |
| 2020 | Flesh and Blood | Vivien | (Mini-series; 4 episodes) |
| 2024 | Showtrial | Dame Harriet Kenny | (Series 2; 3 episodes) |
| 2025 | The Forsytes | Ann Forsyte | (6 episodes) |

== Stage ==
- 1965 The Passion Flower Hotel#Stage adaptation
- 1976 Shakespeare's The Comedy of Errors as Luciana, with the Royal Shakespeare Company (RSC)
- 1977 Shakespeare's Romeo and Juliet as Juliet, with the RSC
- 1995 Shakespeare's Hamlet as Gertrude, with the Almeida Theatre at the Hackney EmpireHamlet (1995): Almeida Theatre Company, Hackney Empire | BBA Shakespeare
- 2001 Ibsen's Ghosts as Helen Alving (28 March-14 July 2001) at the Comedy Theatre, London.
- 1981 Ivan Turgenev's A Month in the Country as Natalya Petrovna, with the National Theatre
- 2005 John Osborne and Anthony Creighton's Epitaph for George Dillon as Ruth, at the Comedy Theatre
- 2009 J. B. Priestley's Time and the Conways as Mrs. Conway, with the National Theatre

== Awards and nominations ==
| Year | Award | Category | Nominated work | Result | Ref. |
|---|---|---|---|---|---|
| 1974 | British Academy Television Awards | Best Actress | A Pin to See the Peepshow | Nominated | |
| 1976 | British Academy Television Awards | Best Actress | Madame Bovary | Nominated | |
| 1977 | Laurence Olivier Awards | Best Actress in a Revival | Troilus and Cressida | Nominated | |
| 1979 | British Academy Television Awards | Best Actress | Lillie | Won | |
| 1998 | British Academy Television Awards | Best Actress | Reckless | Nominated | |
| 1999 | British Academy Television Awards | Best Actress | Reckless | Nominated | |
| 2000 | British Academy Television Awards | Best Actress | Wives and Daughters | Nominated | |
