= Floyd L. Culler, Jr. =

American chemical engineer and nuclear scientist

Floyd L. Culler Jr.
- Born: January 5, 1923
- Died: September 29, 2004 (aged 81)
- Occupation: Chemical engineer
- Employer: Oak Ridge National Laboratory
- Awards: Atoms for Peace Award (1969)

Floyd LeRoy Culler Jr. (January 5, 1923 – September 29, 2004) was an American chemical engineer and nuclear scientist. He served as the acting director of the Oak Ridge National Laboratory (ORNL) and later as president of the Electric Power Research Institute (EPRI). In 1969, he received the Atoms for Peace Award for his contributions to nuclear fuel reprocessing technology.

Floyd Culler Court, a road within the Bethel Valley Industrial Park in Oak Ridge, Tennessee, is named after Culler.
