= Atoms for Peace Award =

Former award

The Atoms for Peace Award was established in 1955 through a grant of $1,000,000 by the Ford Motor Company Fund. An independent nonprofit corporation was set up to administer the award for the development or application of peaceful nuclear technology. It was created in response to U.S. President Dwight D. Eisenhower's Atoms for Peace speech to the United Nations.

The 23 recipients were:

- 1957 – Niels Bohr
- 1958 – George C. de Hevesy
- 1959 – Leó Szilárd and Eugene Paul Wigner
- 1960 – Alvin M. Weinberg and Walter Henry Zinn
- 1961 – Sir John Cockcroft
- 1963 – Edwin M. McMillan and Vladimir I. Veksler
- 1967 – Isidor I. Rabi, W. Bennett Lewis and Bertrand Goldschmidt
- 1968 – Sigvard Eklund, Abdus Salam, and Henry DeWolf Smyth
- 1969 – Aage Bohr, Ben Roy Mottelson, Floyd L. Culler, Jr., Henry Kaplan, Anthony L. Turkevich, Mikhail Ioffe and Compton A. Rennie
- 1969 – Dwight D. Eisenhower
