= Copenhagen (2002 film) =

2002 British television film directed by Howard Davies

- DVD cover
- Based on: Copenhagen by Michael Frayn
- Screenplay by: Howard Davies
- Directed by: Howard Davies
- Starring: Francesca Annis; Daniel Craig; Stephen Rea
- Theme music composer: Dominic Muldowney
- Country of origin: United Kingdom
- Original language: English

Production
- Executive producer: Simon Curtis
- Producers: Megan Callaway; Richard Fell
- Cinematography: Ian Wilson
- Editor: Kevin Lester
- Running time: 90 minutes
- Production companies: BBC; KCET

Original release
- Release: 26 September 2002

Copenhagen is a 2002 British television drama film written and directed by Howard Davies, and starring Daniel Craig, Stephen Rea, and Francesca Annis. It is based on Michael Frayn's 1998 Tony Award-winning three-character play of the same name.

== Synopsis ==
The story concerns a meeting between the physicists Niels Bohr and Werner Heisenberg in Copenhagen in 1941 to discuss their work and past friendship, and also revolves around Heisenberg's role in the German atomic bomb program during World War II.

== Cast ==
- Stephen Rea as Niels Bohr
- Daniel Craig as Werner Heisenberg
- Francesca Annis as Margrethe Bohr

== Production ==
The film was produced by BBC Fictionlab for BBC Four, in association with KCET.

== Release ==
The film was first broadcast on BBC Four on 26 September 2002, preceded by a prologue with Frayn, and followed by an epilogue by physicist Michio Kaku and a documentary on the historical events. It was broadcast in the United States on PBS (the Public Broadcasting Service) as part of the series Hollywood Presents.
