= Compton A. Rennie =

British nuclear scientist and mathematician

- Occupation: Nuclear scientist
- Employer: OECD (Dragon Project)
- Awards: Atoms for Peace Award (1969); CMG (1969)

Compton Alexander Rennie was a British nuclear scientist and mathematician. He is best known for serving as the chief executive of the OECD High Temperature Reactor Project (Dragon Project) based at Winfrith. In 1969, he was awarded the Atoms for Peace Award for his contributions to the peaceful development of nuclear energy.
