= Ernest Bohr =

Danish lawyer (1924–2018)

Personal information
- Nationality: Danish
- Born: 7 March 1924 Frederiksberg, Denmark
- Died: 26 February 2018 (aged 93)
- Parents: Niels Bohr; Margrethe Bohr

Sport
- Country: Denmark
- Sport: Hockey
- Event: Men's team
- Club: Orient (Kongens Lyngby)
- Team: Denmark national field hockey team

Ernest David Bohr (7 March 1924 – 26 February 2018) was a Danish lawyer and field hockey player who played for Denmark in the 1948 Summer Olympics in London.

== Biography ==
Bohr was born in Frederiksberg, Denmark on 7 March 1924, the son of football player and physicist Niels Bohr and Margrethe Nørlund. He graduated from Sortedam High School and later became a barrister. He was named after the New Zealand physicist Ernest Rutherford, who was a friend of Niels, and after Niels' maternal grandfather. He was the brother of physicist Aage Bohr, and the nephew of mathematician Harald Bohr, who played for the Danish silver medal-winning team in football at the 1908 Summer Olympics, which were also held in London. He played Hockey for "Orient" from Kongens Lyngby.

After the German occupation of Denmark, the Bohr family elected to remain in the country despite the fact that the Nazis considered some family members as Jews because Ernest's grandmother Ellen Adler was Jewish. Niels believed he could do the most good by staying in Denmark, but in September 1943 he received word that he would be arrested and brought to Germany. The family then fled to Sweden. Margrethe and the three younger boys remained in Sweden until the war was over.

Bohr played field hockey for Denmark in the 1948 Summer Olympics in London. The competition consisted of a group stage in which three groups played each other in round robin fashion, with the top team on Groups A and B and the top two teams in Group C advancing to the semi-finals. Bohr played in two games. In the first game, at The Polytechnic Stadium at Chiswick on 3 August 1948, the Danish team played Pakistan, one of the strongest teams, and was badly beaten, 9-0. In Denmark's next game, on 5 August at the same ground, the team did better against Belgium, fighting back from being 2-0 at half time to lose 2-1. The Danish team came 13th in the completion, drawing its game against France and losing its other three games, and came bottom of Group C. It did not advance to the semi-finals.

After returning to Denmark, Bohr qualified as a lawyer in 1949. He married Else Richter, a fellow lawyer, on 7 January 1950. Bohr was Chairman of the Board of joint stock companies Wiltax, Slagelse Dampmølle, and Øxenbjerg Dampmølle og Toldbodmøl, and a board member of A/S Møller & Landschultz and Juliet Fond.

== Olympic results ==
Men's Hockey - Group C, London 1948
Rank	Team	Pld	W	D	L	GF	GA	Pts	(Pakistan)	(Netherlands)	(Belgium)	(France)	(Denmark)
1.	Pakistan	4	4	0	0	20	3	8	X	6:1	2:1	3:1	9:0
2.	Netherlands	4	3	0	1	11	8	6	1:6	X	4:1	2:0	4:1
3.	Belgium	4	2	0	2	6	8	4	1:2	1:4	X	2:1	2:1
4.	France	4	0	1	3	4	9	1	1:3	0:2	1:2	X	2:2
5.	Denmark	4	0	1	3	4	17	1	0:9	1:4	1:2	2:2	X

Source: The Official Report of the Organising Committee for the XIV Olympiad
Key: Pld - Played W - won D - drew L - lost GF - goals for GA - goals against Pts - points

Men's Hockey - Ernest Bohr, London 1948
Games	Age	City	Sport	Team	NOC	Phase	Unit	Rank	Date	Result	GP	G
1948 Summer	24	London	Hockey	Denmark	DEN	Final Standings		13	31 July 1948		2	0
1948 Summer	24	London	Hockey	Denmark	DEN	Group C	Match No. 5	2	3 August 1948	PAK 9, DEN 0		
1948 Summer	24	London	Hockey	Denmark	DEN	Group C	Match No. 8	2	5 August 1948	BEL 2, DEN 1		

Source: Ernest Bohr Biography and Olympic results
Key: GP - games played G - goals
