= Margrethe Bohr =

Danish editor, transcriber

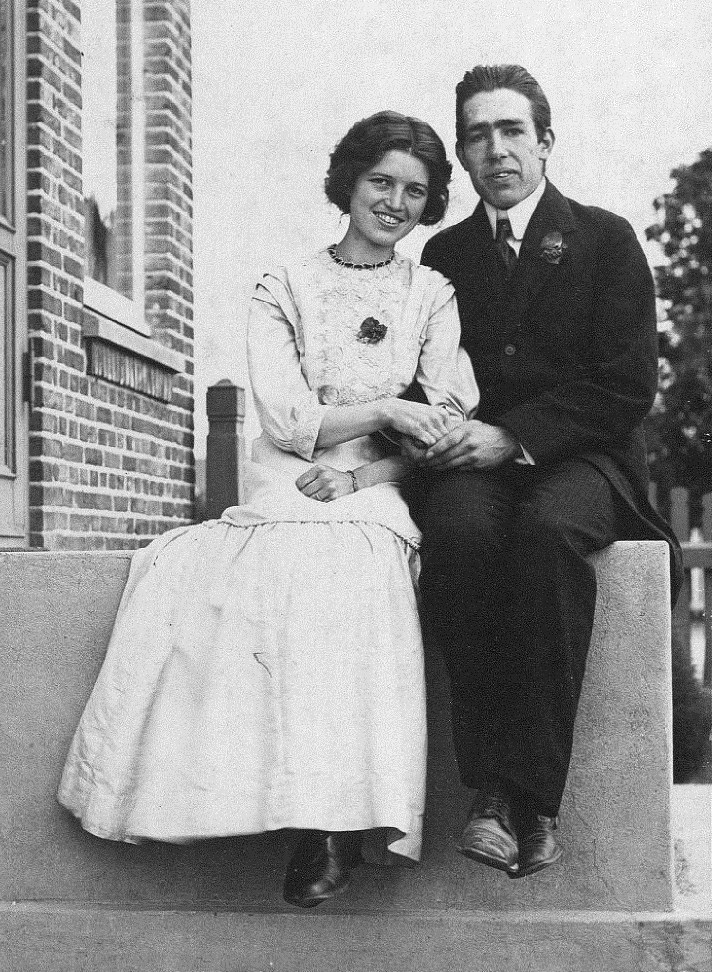
- Engagement photo: Margrethe and Niels Bohr (1910)
- Born: Margrethe Nørlund; 7 March 1890; Slagelse, Denmark
- Died: 21 December 1984 (aged 94); Copenhagen, Denmark
- Occupation: Editor
- Spouse: Niels Bohr (m. 1912; died 1962)
- Children: 6; including Aage and Ernest
- Parents: Alfred Christian Nørlund (1850–1925) (father); Emma Ottine Sophie Holm (1862–1926) (mother)

Margrethe Nørlund Bohr (7 March 1890 – 21 December 1984) was the Danish wife of and collaborator, editor and transcriber for physicist Niels Bohr who received the 1922 Nobel Prize in Physics. Her son, Aage Bohr, won the 1975 Nobel Prize in Physics.

== Biography ==
Margrethe Nørlund was born in Slagelse, Denmark to pharmacist Alfred Christian Nørlund (1850–1925) and Emma Ottine Sophie, née Holm (1862–1926). Her brothers were mathematician Niels Erik Nørlund and architect Poul Nørlund.

=== Early life ===
At age 19, Margrethe was studying to be a French teacher when she met Niels Bohr, a friend of her brother, Niels Nørlund. As she remembered it later, her future husband visited the house several times before she really noticed him. Their relationship progressed quickly and by the summer of 1910 they were engaged. The couple married in a civil ceremony at the Slagelse town hall on 1 August 1912, and by all reports, they remained happily married until Niels died.

The Bohrs had six sons but the oldest and youngest died prematurely. Harald died at about 10 from meningitis and his eldest brother, Christian, drowned at 18 when a storm suddenly overtook the boat he was sailing with his father. Notably, one son, Aage Bohr, became a celebrated physicist like his father and also won the Nobel Prize.

=== Collaboration ===
Margrethe proved essential to her husband’s work from the beginning of their relationship. In 1912, Niels wrote: “I went to the country with my wife and we wrote a very long paper,” thus sharing credit with his new spouse.

Her roles were many but her emphasis was simple, to help Niels explain concepts, even complex ones, in "plain language." As a sounding board, she collaborated with her husband as he worked out his theories, at first by discussing them with her. Then Niels would dictate his thoughts so Margrethe could transcribe and type them (a job his mother had filled before the marriage). Typically, drafts circulated between the two many times. In the course of editing (by both of them), transcribing, re-editing, and retyping the many drafts of her husband’s papers, she insisted that he explain his ideas in language that was understandable to his readers. According to Crease, "She was not only Bohr's constant companion, she was also his intellectual collaborator, a sounding board who helped him with his letters and essays, and to explain his ideas to himself.... she was very smart." According to son Hans Bohr, "My mother was the natural and indispensable center…Her opinions were his [father's] guidelines in daily affairs."

When the First World War broke out, the Bohrs left Denmark and moved to England, staying there until July 1916.

=== Copenhagen ===
In 1921, Niels Bohr founded the Institute for Theoretical Physics (since 1965, known as the Niels Bohr Institute), at the University of Copenhagen and the family moved into a home on campus. He won the Nobel Prize for Physics in 1922.

Margrethe was a welcome fixture in her husband’s work, both socially and due to her practical contributions. She spent a good deal of time with Niels’ various assistants and teammates at the Institute for Theoretical Physics, and later in life recalled not just their scientific successes but the warmth of the home when these young scientists joined them.

During World War II, Margrethe grew concerned when German physicist Werner Heisenberg came to Copenhagen in 1941, apparently to urge her Jewish husband to join him in his research for Germany but Niels was not convinced. When the Germans intensified the persecution of Jews in 1943, the family escaped, moving first to Sweden and then on to England, returning to Denmark after the war's end. The family returned to Copenhagen so Niels could restore and expand his damaged Institute. Niels died in 1962.

Margrethe died in Copenhagen at 94 on 21 December 1984.

== Copenhagen, the play ==
Margrethe and Niels are the primary characters in a play by Michael Frayn, called Copenhagen that dramatizes her role in Bohr's life. The play looks at the couple's real-life collaboration.

As Heisenberg and Bohr recall their science, they remind themselves to always be sure that Margrethe can understand the work discussed in plain language. But in addition to clarifying their science, Margrethe is also key for clarifying their hearts, always pushing the two men to speak to each other about intention, motivation, and memory in the same plain language. The character, like the historical woman, makes Niels’ personal and professional life possible.

Major performances:

- London Premiere – 1998
- Broadway Opening – April 2000 (Tony Award winner for Best Play)
- TV Movie – 2002
- BBC Radio – January 2013

Margrethe is played by Francesca Annis in 2002 film Copenhagen, written and directed by Howard Davies that is based on the play.
