= St. Nicholas Russian Orthodox Cathedral =

Russian Orthodox cathedral in New York City, USA

- St. Nicholas Russian Orthodox Cathedral
- 40°47′18″N 73°57′15″W
- Address: 15 East 97th Street, Manhattan, NY
- Country: United States
- Denomination: Russian Orthodox Church
- Website: ruschurchusa.org

History
- Founded: 1902
- Founder(s): Saint Tikhon (Belavin); Alexander Hotovitzky

Architecture
- Architect: John Bergesen
- Architectural type: Moscow Baroque

St. Nicholas Russian Orthodox Cathedral (Свято-Николаевский собор РПЦ в Нью-Йорке) is located on the Upper East Side of Manhattan, New York City and is the administrative center of the Russian Orthodox Patriarchal Parishes in the USA.

== History ==
St. Nicholas Russian Orthodox Cathedral is the home of a congregation which was founded in the early 1890s on Second Avenue. In 1899, the church began a building fund with seed money from Czar Nicholas to build a new church. The Cathedral, designed by Finnish-born architect John Bergesen, was completed in 1902 at 15 East 97th Street in Manhattan. The first ceremony was celebrated on 20 July 1902 by Tikhon, then Orthodox Bishop of North America (later he returned in Russia in 1907 and became the Patriarch of Moscow in 1917), now canonised as a Saint and a confessor of the Faith. Since 1903, the Cathedral has served as the headquarters for the Russian Orthodox faith in the United States. The building was designated as an official city landmark by the New York City Landmarks Preservation Commission in 1973.

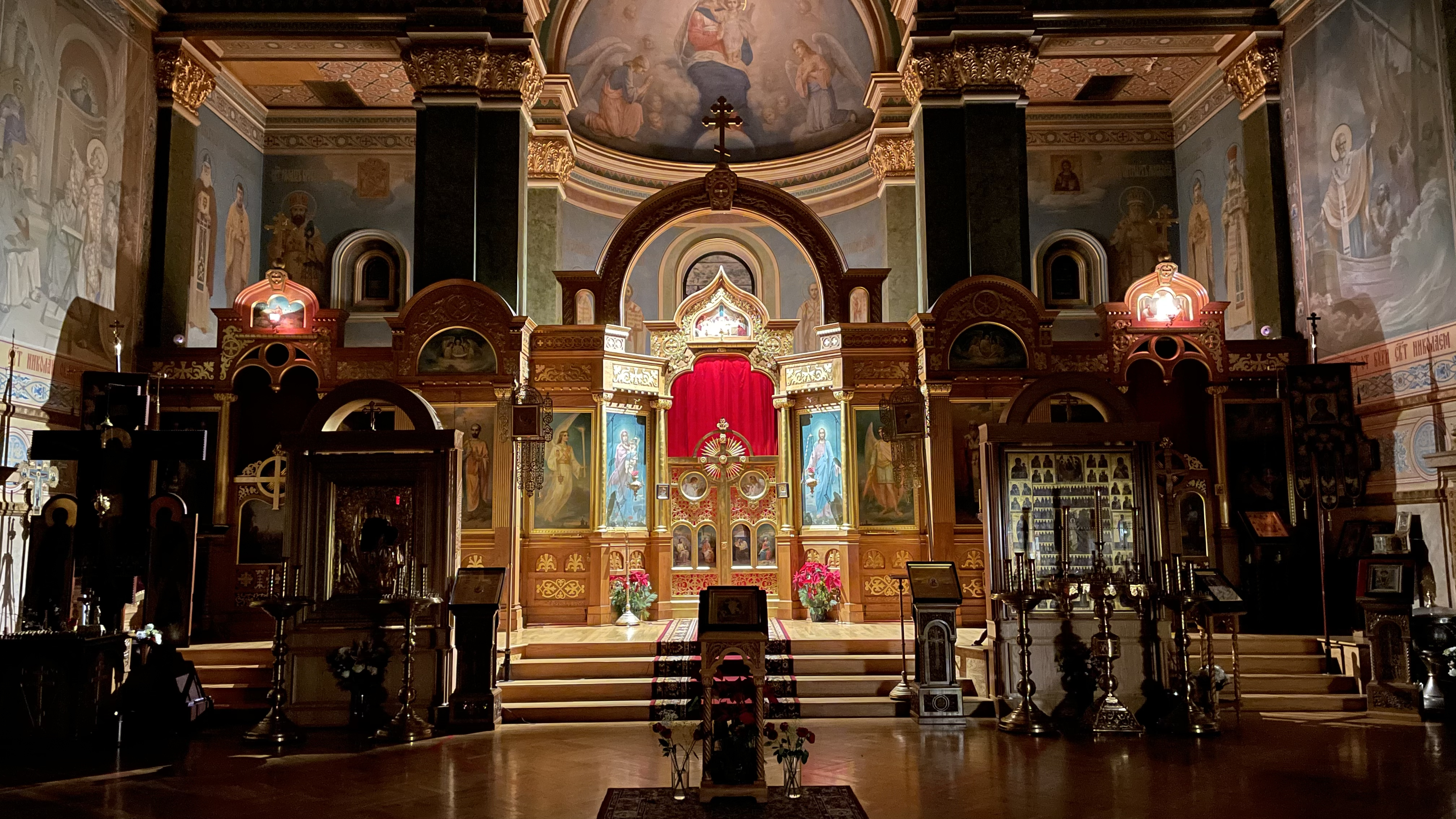
Interior

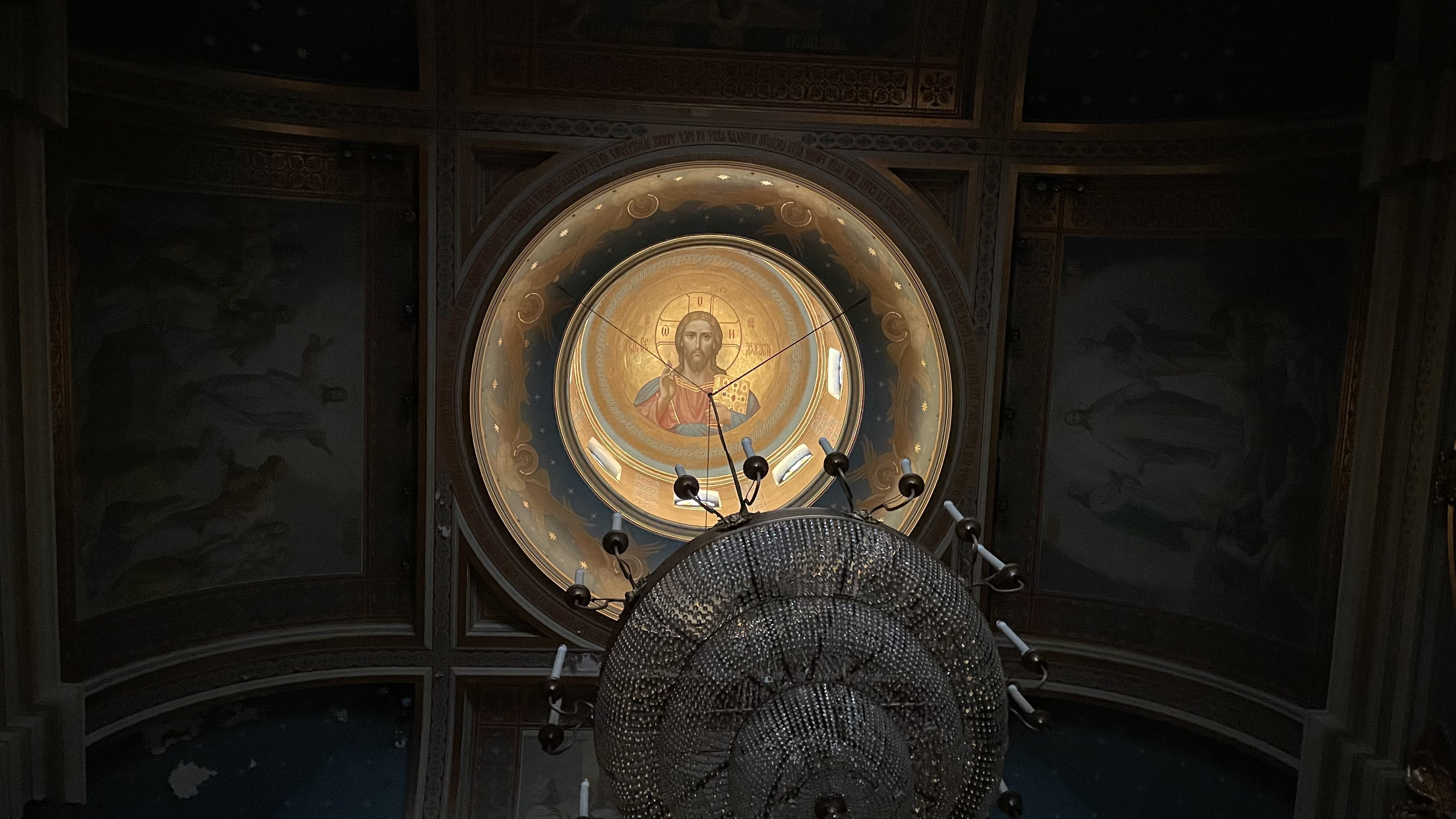
Main dome

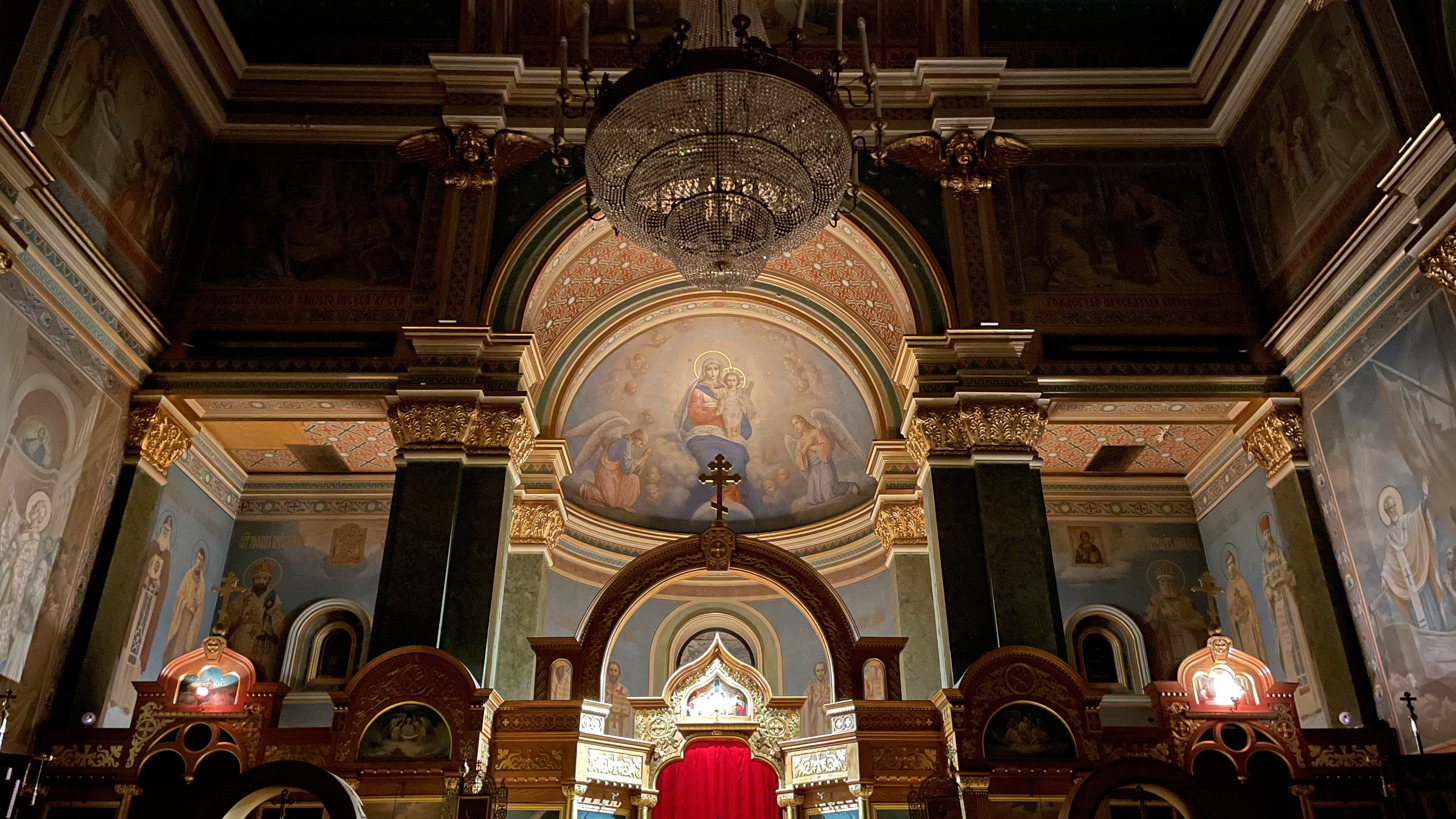
Interior of the St.Nicholas Cathedral ceiling
