= Doug Lucie =

English dramatist

Doug Lucie (born 15 December 1953, Chessington, Greater London) is an English dramatist.

== Career ==
Doug Lucie is a key figure in contemporary writing for the British stage. Lucie had an especially influential run of works in the 1980s and early 1990s. His plays have been produced at the National Theatre, the Royal Shakespeare Company’s Other Place and the Royal Court.

Lucie's work has been hailed by critics for his singular voice and his acid pen. His most influential plays often bristle with sudden and unexpected violence, making him a key transitional figure between the overtly political British drama of the 1970s and the “in-yer-face” school of the 1990s.

His early work as a playwright emerged from the Edinburgh Festival and smaller theatres in the south of England. He was a playwright-in-residence at the Oxford Playhouse in 1979 and 1980, and a visiting writer at the Iowa Writer's Workshop in 1981.

Lucie broke through to a larger audience with Hard Feelings (1982) -- a play set in a gentrifying Brixton before and during its 1981 riots. The success of Hard Feelings began a run of work that included Progress (1984), Key to the World (1984), Fashion (1987), Grace (1992), Gaucho (1994), and The Shallow End (1996).

Lucie's later plays explore themes ranging from work and friendship (The Green Man, 2003) to the intersection of art and politics as it played out in the fertile relationship between acclaimed singers Nick Drake and John Martyn (Solid Air, 2014).

Lucie also writes extensively for radio and television in the United Kingdom.

== Critical reception ==
“[W]here are the aspiring dramatists of either sex who instantly identify themselves by the timbre of their dialogue or the idiosyncrasy of their stance, as Pinter and Bond once did? Doug Lucie perhaps, that sour observer of the go-getting Eighties; no one much else.” Benedict Nightingale, The Times (1990)

"People don't go to Doug Lucie's plays to be tickled under the chin. In the Eighties, his poisonous and hilarious comedies Fashion and Progress gave us portraits of humanity that might prompt second thoughts about that post-show drink with friends. 'A martini of gall and wormwood about the articulate classes' is how one critic described his style."—Sarah Hemming, The Independent (1992)

"This is an angry account of a stratified Britain, in which the sons and daughters of the well-off enjoy a head start in life. Is anything that different today?"—Michael Billington, The Guardian, on the 2012 revival of Hard Feelings.

== Plays ==
- John Clare's Mad Nuncle (Edinburgh, 1975)
- Rough Trade (Oxford Playhouse, 1978)
- We Love You (Roundhouse, 1978)
- Oh Well (Oxford Playhouse, 1978)
- The New Garbo (Hull Truck and King's Head, London, 1978)
- Heroes (Edinburgh and New End Theatre, London 1979)
- Poison Edinburgh Festival, 1980)
- Strangers in the Night, New End Theatre, 1981)
- Hard Feelings (Oxford Playhouse tour, 1982, Bush Theatre, 1983)
- Progress (Bush Theatre, 1984)
- Key to the World (Paines Plough, Leicester Haymarket, and Lyric Theatre Studio, Hammersmith, 1984)
- Fashion (RSC, 1987 and Leicester Haymarket and Tricycle, London, 1989)
- Doing the Business (Royal Court, 1990)
- Grace (Hampstead Theatre, 1992)
- Gaucho (Hampstead Theatre, 1994)
- The Shallow End (Royal Court 1997)
- Love You, Too (Bush Theatre, 1998)
- The Green Man (Plymouth, Drum Theatre, 2002)
- Pass it On (Shell Connections, 2006)
- Solid Air (Plymouth 2013)

== Adaptations ==
- The Moonstone (BBC 2010)

== Personal life ==
Lucie was for a time in the 21st century homeless before settling in Thame.
