= Copenhagen (play) =

Play about 1941 atom bomb meeting

- 1998 Premiere season programme
- Original language: English
- Written by: Michael Frayn
- Characters: Niels Bohr; Margrethe Bohr; Werner Heisenberg
- Subject: Physics, Politics, WWII, Memory, Perspective
- Genre: Historical Drama

Premiere
- Date: 1998
- Place: London, England

Copenhagen is a play by Michael Frayn, based on an event that occurred in Copenhagen in 1941, a meeting between the physicists Niels Bohr and Werner Heisenberg, who had been Bohr's student. It premiered in London in 1998, at the National Theatre, running for more than 300 performances, starring David Burke (Niels Bohr), Sara Kestelman (Margrethe Bohr), and Matthew Marsh (Werner Heisenberg).

It opened on Broadway at the Royale Theatre on 11 April 2000 and ran for 326 performances. Directed by Michael Blakemore, it starred Philip Bosco (Niels Bohr), Michael Cumpsty (Werner Heisenberg), and Blair Brown (Margrethe Bohr). It won the Tony Award for Best Play, Best Featured Actress in a Play, Blair Brown, and Best Direction of a Play (Michael Blakemore).

In 2002, the play was adapted as a film by Howard Davies, produced by the BBC and presented on the Public Broadcasting Service (PBS) in the United States.

== Summary ==
Three spirits come together to try to apprehend and explain one simple question: "Why did Heisenberg go to Copenhagen?" The rest of the play details information around this subject through argument and interjections.

Heisenberg – "No one understands my trip to Copenhagen. Time and time again I've explained it. To Bohr himself, and Margrethe. To interrogators and intelligence officers, to journalists and historians. The more I've explained, the deeper the uncertainty has become. Well, I shall be happy to make one more attempt."

Along the way, Heisenberg and Bohr "draft" several versions of their 1941 exchange, arguing about the ramifications of each potential version of their meeting and the motives behind it. They discuss the idea of nuclear power and its control, the rationale behind building or not building an atomic bomb, the uncertainty of the past and the inevitability of the future as embodiments of themselves acting as particles drifting through the atom that is Copenhagen.

== Characters ==
In most dramas in which the characters are based on real people, there is a point at which the character deviates from the real person. However, playwright Michael Frayn worked to keep that distinction as small as possible. Having studied memoirs and letters and other historical records of the two physicists, Frayn felt confident in claiming that "The actual words spoken by [the] characters are entirely their own." With that in mind, the character descriptions apply to both the representative characters as well as the physicists themselves. There is a great amount known about all of the primary characters presented in Copenhagen; the following includes those bits of information which are directly relevant and referenced in the work itself.

- Werner Heisenberg was born in 1901, in Würzburg, Germany. The son of a university professor, Heisenberg grew up in an environment with an intense emphasis on academics, but was exposed to the destruction that World War I dealt to Germany at a rather young age. He married Elisabeth Schumacher, also the child of a professor, and they had seven children. He received his doctorate in 1923 from the physicist Arnold Sommerfeld, and went to Copenhagen to study quantum mechanics with Niels Bohr in 1924, when he was 22, and replaced Bohr's assistant, H. A. Kramers. In 1926, the University of Leipzig offered Heisenberg the opportunity to become Germany's youngest full professor. He is best known for his "Uncertainty Principle", (translated from the German Ungenauigkeit [inexactness] or Unschärfe [lack of sharpness] Relation, which was later changed to Unbestimmtheit meaning "indeterminacy".) In 1927, he and Bohr presented the Copenhagen interpretation of quantum mechanics. During the Second World War, Heisenberg worked for Germany, researching atomic technology and heading their nuclear reactor program. After the war, his involvement with the Nazis earned him certain notoriety in the world of physicists, mainly due to the fact that he could have given Germany the means to produce and use nuclear arms. He continued his research until his death in 1976 in Munich.
- Niels Bohr was born in 1885, making him 38 when Heisenberg first came to work with him. He married Margrethe Norlund in 1912 in Copenhagen and together they had six sons, two of whom died while young. Biographer Harry Lustig notes that "Most of the world's great theoretical physicists... spent periods of their lives at Bohr's Institute." Before the war, his research was instrumental in nuclear research, some of which led to the building of the atomic bomb. During the war, however, Bohr was living in occupied Denmark and somewhat restricted in his research; he escaped to Sweden in 1943, just before an SS sweep which would have targeted him through his Jewish heritage. In the US, he worked in Los Alamos on the atomic bomb until the end of the war. He died in 1962 and was survived by his wife, Margrethe.
- Margrethe Bohr, known later in her life as Dronning or "Queen" Margrethe, was born in 1890 in Denmark. She was closely involved in her husband's work; he would commonly bounce ideas off her, trying to explain them in "plain language". She died in 1984, survived by several of her children. Her son Hans wrote, "My mother was the natural and indispensable centre. Father knew how much mother meant to him and never missed an opportunity to show his gratitude and love.... Her opinions were his guidelines in daily affairs."

== Style ==
The construction of the plot is non-linear, seeing as it does not exist in time and space. Sometimes one character will not notice that there are other people in the space, and speak as if to no one. The world that Frayn presents is outside of our conceptions as audience members, simply by virtue of the fact that no one attending the play has ever died. So the world in which Copenhagen is based is somewhere between heaven and an atom.

It can also be thought to exist "inside the heads" of the characters present. It is a subjective world, taking and manipulating history, picking apart some events and mashing others together to better compare them. The characters are all plagued by some form of guilt or another, particularly in reference to the atomic bomb, and they are trapped in this world, doomed to forever speculate on that evening in Copenhagen in 1941 to determine how the world might have been changed. These are all traits of Expressionism.

In his preface to A Dream Play, August Strindberg notes that in these worlds, "everything is possible and probable. Time and space do not exist. Working with... real events as a background, the imagination spins out its threads of thoughts and weaves them into new patterns." Copenhagen is an embodiment of these principles.

== Recurring images and motifs ==
Because the concepts in physics and politics are at times very complicated or very abstract, Frayn uses several controlling images to better relate certain ideas to his audience.

• Skiing and Table-Tennis – These two activities are referred to as a pastime of Bohr and Heisenberg's, and both demonstrate the competition between the two (representative of national competition.) They are also used to suggest Heisenberg's speed and recklessness, which contrasts with Bohr's caution and tediousness.

• Invisible Straight – An anecdote in which Bohr managed to bluff himself in a game of poker by betting on a straight that he thought he had, but he really did not. That principle is applied to nuclear weaponry, suggesting that nations will act differently when they think that an opponent can produce nuclear arms, whether or not the opponent can.

• Cap-Pistols, Land Mines and Nuclear Reactors – These fall into the Toy vs. Weapon theme and once again presents anecdotes of Bohr and Heisenberg's lives. Their fascination in playing with the new toy blinds them to the danger that it poses.

• Bomb – The term "bomb" appears as a literal looming image in many cases, but it is used figuratively in a couple of instances, as if it should be a joke, but with such grave implications that it cannot be found funny. (For example, Heisenberg refers to a "bomb having gone off" in Bohr's head.)

• Christian Reaching for the Life-Buoy – Christian was one of Bohr's sons, who drowned while he and Bohr were out sailing. The phrase "Christian reaches for the life-buoy" appears several times during the play, and every time, the characters seem to hold their breath in the hope that this time, Christian will survive. Bohr had concluded that they would have both drowned had he jumped in to save his son, which presents an idea of futile heroics, particularly with reference to Heisenberg and what should happen if he were to resist Hitler's rule.

• "Another Draft" – Whenever the characters conclude that an interpretation of their 1941 meeting is incorrect, they call for "another draft".

== Production history ==
London Premiere – 1998

Copenhagen opened in the National Theatre in London and ran for more than 300 performances, starring David Burke as Niels Bohr, Sara Kestelman as Margrethe Bohr, and Matthew Marsh as Werner Heisenberg. It was directed by Michael Blakemore.

"Copenhagen" transferred to the Duchess Theatre in London's West End, where it ran from 8 February 1999, for more than 750 performances. It had a "second" cast when it opened in the West End, who were responsible for performing at least one of the matinee shows each week. The second cast consisted of David Baron as Niels Bohr, Corinna Marlowe as Margarethe Bohr, and William Brand as Werner Heisenberg, and after six months, they replaced the original cast for the rest of the West End run.

Broadway Opening – April 2000

Continuing under the direction of Michael Blakemore, it opened on Broadway at the Royale Theatre on 11 April and ran for 326 performances. Starring Philip Bosco as Bohr, Michael Cumpsty as Heisenberg and Blair Brown as Margrethe, it went on to win the Tony Award for Best Play, along with two others for Best Featured Actress in a Play (Blair Brown), and Best Direction of a Play (Michael Blakemore). But even for its success, Frayn admitted in an article that "A number of commentators expressed misgivings about the whole enterprise." Several critics noted that it was heavy with scientific dialogue, a little too heavy for the common audience. Though a writer from Physics World hailed it as "brilliant theatre ", Charles Spencer, of The Daily Telegraph, wrote, "I felt that my brain was being stretched to breaking point—well beyond breaking point, in fact."

International Productions

1999 – France

- At the Théâtre Montparnasse (Paris). Adapted by Jean-Marie Besset, directed by Michaël Blakemore and with Pierre Vaneck, Niels Arestrup and Maïa Simon, the play won four Molière Prizes.

1999 - Finland

- At the Swedish Theatre: Starring Rabbe Smedlund as Niels Bohr, directed by Anna Simberg

2000 – Denmark

- The Danish production at Betty Nansen Teatret was directed by Peter Langdal and featured Søren Pilmark as Heisenberg, Henning Moritzen as Niels Bohr, and Lilly Weiding as his wife. The minimalist scenography was created by Steffen Aarfing.

2001 – Finland

- At the Helsinki City Theatre, featuring Hannu Lauri, Mika Nuojua and Leena Uotila, directed by Neil Hardwick based on a translation by Petri Friari, opened on 18 October 2001.

2001 – Uruguay

- At the Teatro Stella D'Italia (Montevideo), with Júver Salcedo, Mary Da Cuña and Humberto de Vargas. It was directed by Jorge Denevi. It received the Florencio Award for Best Production, Best Theatrical Direction, and Best Actor (awarded to De Vargas).

2002 – Argentina

- At the Teatro Municipal General San Martín (Buenos Aires), with Juan Carlos Gené, Alberto Segado and Alicia Verdaxagar. It was directed by Carlos Gandolfo. It ran for four consecutive years and is considered one of the biggest hits in the history of that theatre.

2003 – Spain

- By Fila Siete y Armonía Production in Madrid in April 2003 with Fernando Delgado, Juan Gea and Sonsoles Benedicto. It was directed by Román Calleja.

2017 – Italy

- At the Teatro Argentina (Rome). Translated by Filippo Ottoni and Maria Teresa Petruzzi, directed by Mauro Avogadro, with Umberto Orsini, Giuliana Lojodice and Massimo Popolizio. National touring in 2018.

2019 – Spain

- It opened 15 February in Avilés. After touring the country, it will open in Madrid 23 May at the Teatro de la Abadia. Produced by PTC and directed by Claudio Tolcachir, the cast includes Emilio Gutiérrez Caba, Carlos Hipólito and Malena Gutiérrez.

2022 – Turkey

- A 75-minute single-act adaptation premiered on 8 December 2022 at the "K! Kültüral Performing Arts" theatre in Istanbul. Translated to Turkish and directed by Noyan Ayturan, the cast includes Umut Beşkırma as Heisenberg, Yaman Ceri as Niels Bohr, and Burcu Ger as Margrethe Bohr.

2023 – Finland

- Ryhmäteatteri, Helsinki, between 7 October—9 December 2023. Starring Santtu Karvonen, Minna Suuronen, Robin Svartström. Directed by Juha Kukkonen based on the same translation as the 2001 edition.

TV Movie – 2002

The play was adapted as a television movie in 2002, with Daniel Craig as Heisenberg, Stephen Rea as Niels Bohr, and Francesca Annis as Margrethe Bohr. The movie substantially cuts down the script of the play, eliminating several recurring themes, and most of the material that established the community of scientists in Copenhagen. It also abandons the abstract staging of the theatrical version in favour of being set in the city of Copenhagen, in Bohr's old house.

Recent revivals

The play has had many productions and revivals, including:

- Royal Lyceum Theatre in Edinburgh, with Tom Mannion as Niels Bohr, Sally Edwards as Margrethe Bohr, and Owen Oakeshott as Werner Heisenberg. It was directed by Tony Cownie.
- the New Vic Theatre in Staffordshire with John O'Mahony as Niels Bohr, Jamie Hinde as Heisenberg and Deborah Maclaren as Margrethe Bohr. It was directed by James Dacre.
- The Living Theatre in New York City with Lou Vuolo as Bohr, Mary Ann Hay as Margrethe, and Keith Herron as Heisenberg. It was directed by Anne Pasquale.
- The Lyceum theatre in Sheffield with Henry Goodman as Niels Bohr, Geoffrey Streatfeild as Werner Heisenberg and Barbara Flynn as Margrethe. It was directed by David Grindley.
- Ranga Shankara in Bangalore with Prakash Belawadi as Niels Bohr, Nakul Bhalla as Werner Heisenberg and Sharanya Ramprakash/Rukmini Vijayakumar as Margrethe. It was directed by Prakash Belawadi.
- Pratyay Amateur Theatre Art Centre (प्रत्यय हौशी नाट्य कला केंद्र, कोल्हापूर) of Kolhapur (Maharashtra State, India), in Marathi translation by Dr Sharad Navare (शरद नावरे), directed by Dr Sharad Bhuthadiya (शरद भुथाडिया), with Sagar Talashikar (सागर तळाशीकर) as Werner Heisenberg, Dr Sharad Bhuthadiya as Niels Bohr and Meghana Khare (मेघना खरे) as Margrethe.
- Oxford University's The Michael Pilch Studio Theatre in October 2016 with Rupert Stonehill as Heisenberg, George Varley as Bohr and Miranda Collins as Margrethe. It was produced by Emma Irving, directed by Archie Thomson, and assistant directed by Jack Cammack.
- The Lantern Theatre in Philadelphia, Pennsylvania, directed by Kittson O'Neill, with Charles McMahon as Heisenberg, Sally Mercer as Margrethe Bohr, and Paul L. Nolan as Niels Bohr.
- Indra’s Net Theater in Berkeley, CA, with Aaron Wilton as Heisenberg, Nancy Carlin as Margrethe Bohr, and Robert Ernst as Niels Bohr, directed by Bruce Coughran.
- Balch Arena Theater at Tufts University with Artoun Festekjian as Niels Bohr, Maya Grodman as Margrethe Bohr, and Alex Kaufman as Werner Heisenberg. It was directed by Michael Roubey, February 2013.
- Cesear's Forum, a minimalist theatre company at Playhouse Square, Cleveland, Ohio, presented the play, with Dana Hart, Mary Alice Beck and Brian Bowers, in a September/October 2019 production. Cleveland Scene's Elaine Cicora noted: "While Copenhagen's weirdness has historically drawn some grumblings from critics and audiences alike, the three-actor cast assembled here – comprising established veterans of the Cleveland theater scene – does a commendable job of illuminating the humanity inside this piece of historical fiction."

Radio – January 2013

Adapted and directed by Emma Harding for BBC Radio 3 starring Benedict Cumberbatch as Werner Heisenberg, Greta Scacchi as Margrethe Bohr and Simon Russell Beale as Niels Bohr.

== Awards and honours ==
- Evening Standard Award for Best Play (winner, 1998)
- Molière Award for Best New Play (winner, 1999)
- Drama Desk Award for Outstanding Play (winner, 2000)
- New York Drama Critics' Circle for Best Foreign Play (winner, 2000)
- Tony Award for Best Play (winner, 2000)

== Historical debate ==
The meeting took place in September 1941 when Bohr and Heisenberg were 55 and 39, respectively. Heisenberg had worked with Bohr in Copenhagen for several years starting in 1924.

Much of the initial controversy stemmed from a 1956 letter Heisenberg sent to the journalist Robert Jungk after reading the German edition of Jungk's book, Brighter than a Thousand Suns (1956). In the letter, Heisenberg said he had come to Copenhagen to discuss with Bohr his moral objections toward scientists working on nuclear weapons but how he had failed to say that clearly before the conversation came to a halt. Jungk published an extract from the letter in the Danish edition of the book in 1956 that made it appear as if Heisenberg was claiming to have sabotaged the German bomb project on moral grounds. Jungk omitted a critical sentence from Heisenberg: "I would not want this remark to be misunderstood as saying that I myself engaged in resistance to Hitler. On the contrary, I have always been ashamed in the face of the men of 20 July (some of whom were friends of mine), who at that time accomplished truly serious resistance at the cost of their lives."

Bohr was outraged after reading the extract in his copy of the book, feeling that it was false and that the 1941 meeting had proven to him that Heisenberg was quite happy to produce nuclear weapons for Germany. Bohr drafted a number of letters about this issue, but did not send them.

Jungk's book was influential on Frayn's play via the work of journalist Thomas Powers, who repeated the claims that Heisenberg had sabotaged the German nuclear program in a 1993 book, further asserting that the Copenhagen meeting was actually a counterintelligence operation to let Bohr in on what the Nazis were up to. Frayn's play, which portrays Powers' theory sympathetically as a possible interpretation of the meeting, brought more attention to what previously had been a primarily scholarly discussion. After the play inspired numerous scholarly and media debates over the 1941 meeting, in 2002 the Niels Bohr Archive in Copenhagen released to the public all sealed documents related to the meeting. Among the documents were the unsent letters Bohr drafted to Heisenberg about Jungk's book and other topics. Many historians have strongly criticised the play on the basis of the released letters, contending:

- Heisenberg did not know how to build a bomb, and so could not have withheld the information.
- There is no evidence Heisenberg wanted Germany to lose the war, let alone secretly undermined the German war effort.
- There is no evidence Heisenberg proposed some agreement between physicists to not build the bomb.
- Heisenberg and Carl von Weizsäcker have been consistently dishonest about the Copenhagen meeting.

A collection of historical essays provoked by the play was published in English in 2005, with the vast majority of historians disagreeing with Frayn's depiction of the events. In a March 2006 interview Ivan Supek, one of Heisenberg's students and friends, commented that "Copenhagen is a bad play" and that "Frayn mixed up some things". Supek also claimed that Weizsäcker was the main figure of the meeting. Allegedly, "Heisenberg and Weizsäcker came to Bohr wearing German army uniforms. Weizsäcker tried to persuade Bohr to mediate for peace between Great Britain and Germany and Heisenberg practically completely relied on his political judgement". Supek received these details in a confidential conversation with Margrethe, who thought he would never make them public. Supek however felt it was "his duty to announce these facts so that future generations can know the truth about the Bohr – Heisenberg meeting".

In a 2016 assessment by Alex Wellerstein, the nuclear historian asserts that the truth of the Copenhagen meeting is that "we’ll never know, and it probably isn’t that important in the scheme of things". Nevertheless, he argues that Frayn's play creates a false balance in ascribing undue credibility to the theory (rejected by almost all historians) that Heisenberg sabotaged the German nuclear program, a theory Heisenberg did not directly advocate (being misquoted by Jungk) but also did not publicly dispute. The play was accurate in not portraying the Nazis as narrowly failing to obtain the bomb, but there were many other far more plausible reasons for their failure. On the other hand, Wellerstein praised the play for the moral questions it raised and for creating public interest in history.

== Physicists referenced ==
Over the course of the play, a number of renowned physicists are mentioned. Many of them are referenced in the context of their work with either Bohr or Heisenberg. This is the order they appear in the script:

- Max Born
- Pascual Jordan
- Carl von Weizsäcker
- Rozental Petersen — a composite character representing younger Danish physicists like Stefan Rozental.
- Christian Møller
- Samuel Goudsmit
- Albert Einstein
- Wolfgang Pauli
- Otto Frisch
- Lise Meitner
- Arnold Sommerfeld, Max von Laue, and Karl Wirtz
- Otto Hahn – credited with the discovery of fission
- Fritz Strassmann
- Enrico Fermi
- John Wheeler
- Robert Oppenheimer
- Erwin Schrödinger
- Hendrik Casimir
- Frédéric Joliot-Curie
- Louis de Broglie
- George Gamow
- Lev Landau
- Oskar Klein
- James Chadwick
- Victor Weisskopf
- Fritz Houtermans
- Edward Teller
- Leó Szilárd
- Paul Dirac
- H.A. Kramers
- George Uhlenbeck
- Rudolph Peierls

== See also ==
- Deutsche Physik
- Doctor Atomic
- History of nuclear weapons
- Operation Alsos (attempt during WW2 and postwar to gauge the progress of the German bomb project)
- Operation Epsilon
- Manhattan Project (Allied wartime bomb project)
- The Bomb – 2015 PBS film documentary
- Uranverein (Nazi wartime bomb project)
