= 1860 Oxford evolution debate =

Discussion about evolution in Oxford, England

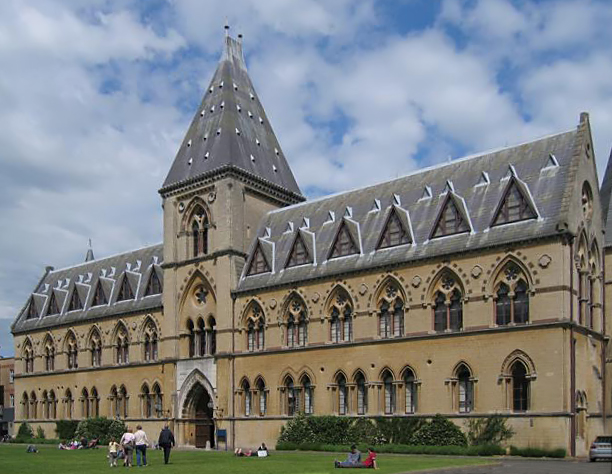
The debate took place in the Oxford University Museum of Natural History.

The 1860 Oxford evolution debate took place at the Oxford University Museum in Oxford, England, on 7 July 1860, seven months after the publication of Charles Darwin's On the Origin of Species. Several prominent British scientists and philosophers participated, including Thomas Henry Huxley, Bishop Samuel Wilberforce, Benjamin Brodie, Joseph Dalton Hooker and Robert FitzRoy.

The encounter is often known as the Huxley–Wilberforce debate or the Wilberforce–Huxley debate, although this description is somewhat misleading. It was not a formal debate between the two, but rather it was an animated discussion after the presentation of a paper by John William Draper of New York University, on the intellectual development of Europe with relation to Darwin's theory (one of a number of scientific papers presented during the week as part of the British Association's annual meeting). Although Huxley and Wilberforce were not the only participants in the discussion, they were reported to be the two dominant parties.

The debate is best remembered today for a heated exchange in which Wilberforce supposedly asked Huxley whether it was through his grandfather or his grandmother that he claimed his descent from a monkey. Huxley is said to have replied that he would not be ashamed to have a monkey for his ancestor, but he would be ashamed to be connected with a man who used his great gifts to obscure the truth. However, what Huxley and Wilberforce actually said is uncertain, and subsequent accounts were subject to distortion since no verbatim account of the debate exists. One eyewitness suggests that Wilberforce's question to Huxley may have been "whether, in the vast shaky state of the law of development, as laid down by Darwin, any one can be so enamoured of this so-called law, or hypothesis, as to go into jubilation for his great great grandfather having been an ape or a gorilla?", whereas another suggests he may have said that "it was of little consequence to himself whether or not his grandfather might be called a monkey or not."

== Background ==
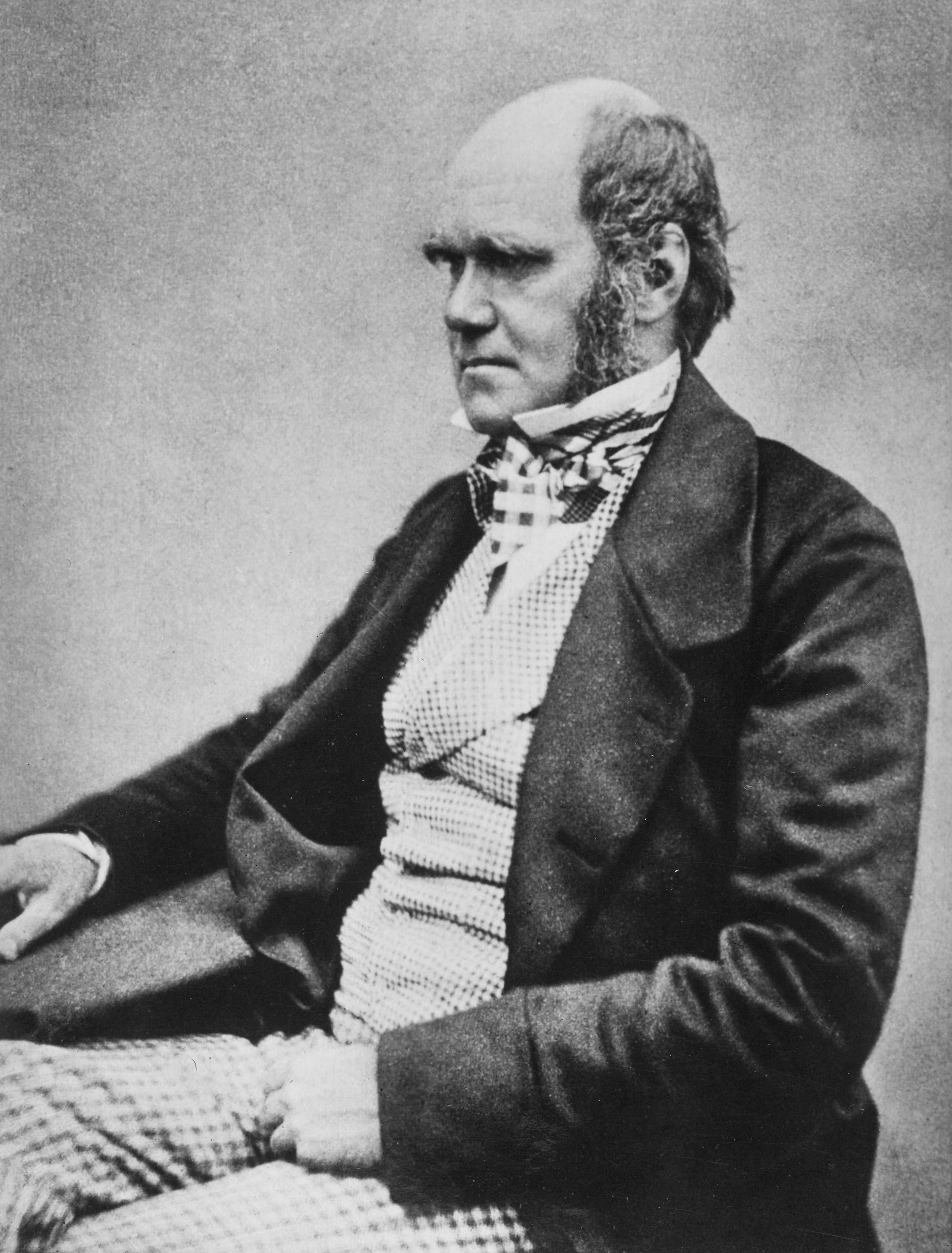
Charles Darwin, whose theory was at the centre of the debate

The idea of transmutation of species was seen as contrary to religious orthodoxy and a threat to the social order and thus was very controversial in the first half of the nineteenth century, although Radicals seeking to widen democracy and overturn the aristocratic hierarchy welcomed it. The scientific community was wary in the absence of a proposed mechanism.

The anonymous publication of Vestiges of the Natural History of Creation, supporting the idea of transmutation of species, in 1844 brought a storm of controversy but attracted wide readership and became a bestseller. At the British Association for the Advancement of Science meeting at Oxford in May 1847, the Bishop of Oxford Samuel Wilberforce used his Sunday sermon at St. Mary's Church on "the wrong way of doing science" to deliver a stinging attack obviously aimed at its author, Robert Chambers, in a church "crowded to suffocation" with archaeologists, geoscientists, astronomers, chemists, physicists, and biologists. The scientific establishment also remained skeptical, but the book had convinced a vast popular audience.

Charles Darwin's On the Origin of Species was published on 24 November 1859 to wide debate and controversy. Influential biologist Richard Owen wrote an anonymous negative review of the book in the Edinburgh Review and coached Wilberforce, who also wrote an anonymous 17,000-word review in the Quarterly Review.

Thomas Henry Huxley, one of the small group with whom Darwin had shared his theory before publication, emerged as the main public champion of evolution. He wrote a favourable review of "Origin" in The Times in December 1859, along with several other articles, and delivered a lecture at the Royal Institution in February 1860.

The reaction of many orthodox churchmen was hostile, but their attention was diverted in February 1860 by a much greater furore over the publication of Essays and Reviews by seven liberal theologians. Amongst them, the Reverend Baden Powell had already praised evolutionary ideas, and in his essay he commended "Mr. Darwin's masterly volume" for substantiating "the grand principle of the self-evolving powers of nature".

The controversy was at the centre of attention when the British Association for the Advancement of Science (often referred to then simply as "the BA") convened their annual meeting at the new Oxford University Museum of Natural History in June 1860. On Thursday 28 June, Charles Daubeny read a paper "On the final causes of the sexuality in plants, with particular reference to Mr. Darwin's work..." Owen and Huxley were both in attendance, and a debate erupted over Darwin's theory. Owen spoke of facts which would enable the public to "come to some conclusions ... of the truth of Mr. Darwin's theory" and repeated an anatomical argument which he had first presented in 1857, that "the brain of the gorilla was more different from that of man than from that of the lowest primate particularly because only man had a posterior lobe, a posterior horn, and a hippocampus minor." Huxley was convinced this was incorrect and had researched its errors. For the first time he spoke publicly on this point and "denied altogether that the difference between the brain of the gorilla and man was so great" in a "direct and unqualified contradiction" of Owen, citing previous studies as well as promising to provide detailed support for his position.

Wilberforce agreed to address the meeting on Saturday morning, and there was expectation that he would repeat his success at scourging evolutionary ideas as at the 1847 meeting. Huxley was initially reluctant to engage Wilberforce in a public debate about evolution, but, in a chance encounter, Robert Chambers persuaded him not to desert the cause. The Reverend Baden Powell would have been on the platform, too, but he had died of a heart attack on 11 June.

== Debate ==
The main protagonists, as caricatured in Vanity Fair

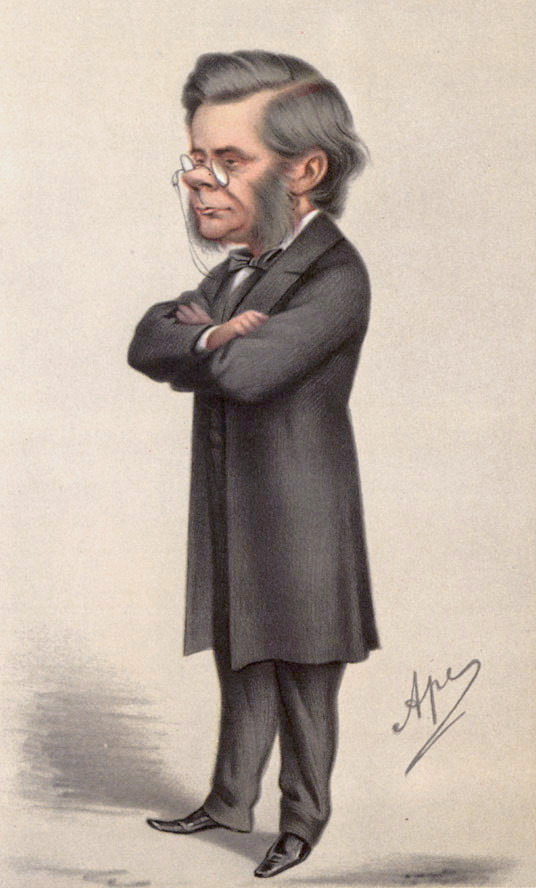
Huxley (1871)

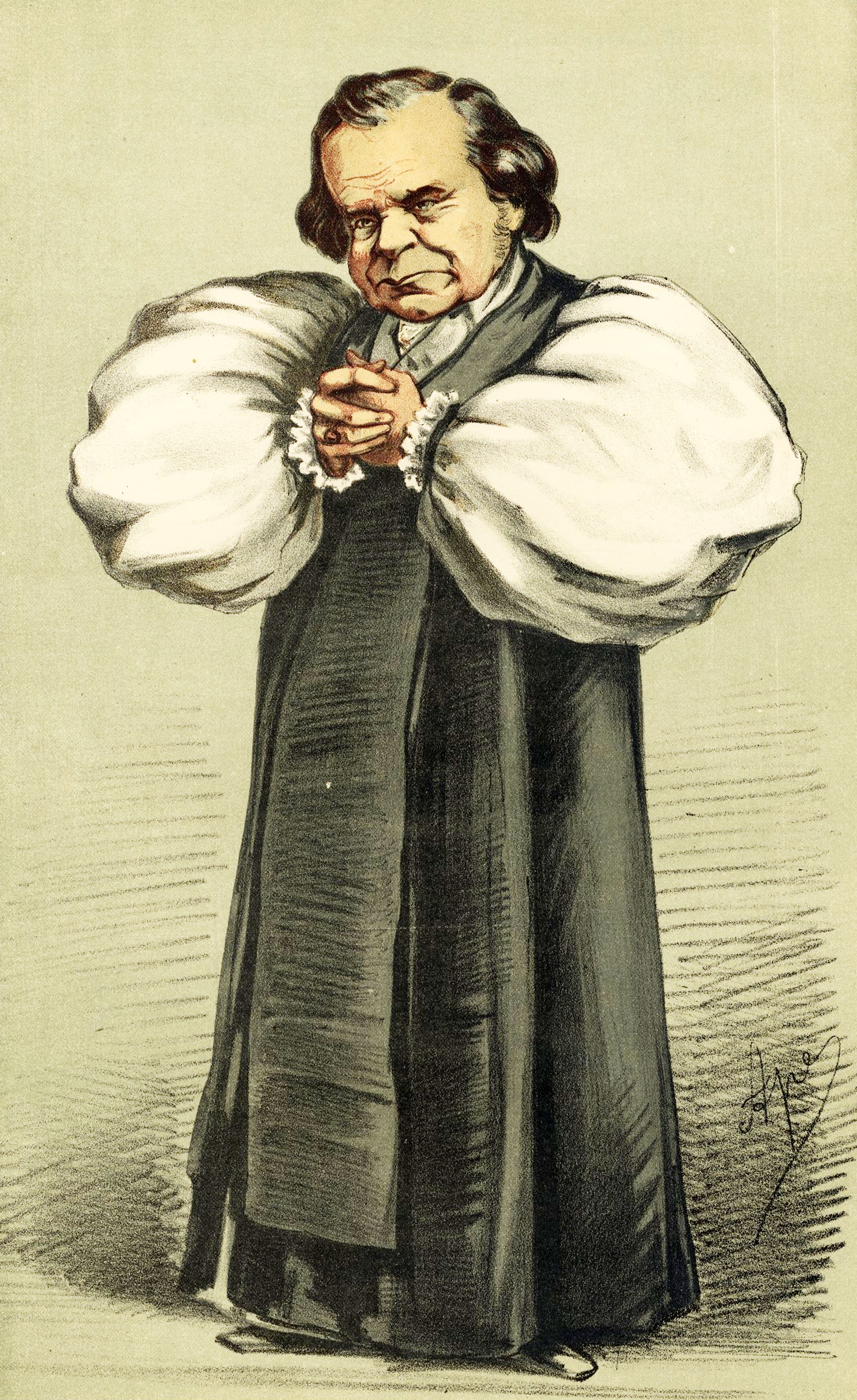
Wilberforce (1869)

Word spread that Bishop Samuel Wilberforce would speak against Darwin's theory at the meeting on Saturday 30 June 1860. Wilberforce was one of the greatest public speakers of his day but was known as "Soapy Sam" (from a comment by Benjamin Disraeli that the Bishop's manner was "unctuous, oleaginous, saponaceous"). According to Bryson, "more than a thousand people crowded into the chamber; hundreds more were turned away." Darwin himself was too sick to attend.

The discussion was chaired by John Stevens Henslow, Darwin's former mentor from Cambridge. It has been suggested that Owen arranged for Henslow to chair the discussion "hoping to make the expected defeat of Darwin the more complete". The main focus of the meeting was supposed to be a lecture by New York University's John William Draper, "On the Intellectual Development of Europe, considered with reference to the views of Mr. Darwin and others, that the progression of organisms is determined by law". By all accounts, Draper's presentation was long and boring. After Draper had finished, Henslow called on several other speakers, including Benjamin Brodie, the president of the Royal Society, before it was Wilberforce's turn.

In a letter to his brother Edward, the ornithologist Alfred Newton wrote:

In the Nat. Hist. Section we had another hot Darwinian debate ... After [lengthy preliminaries] Huxley was called upon by Henslow to state his views at greater length, and this brought up the Bp. of Oxford ... Referring to what Huxley had said two days before, about after all its not signifying to him whether he was descended from a Gorilla or not, the Bp. chafed him and asked whether he had a preference for the descent being on the father's side or the mother's side? This gave Huxley the opportunity of saying that he would sooner claim kindred with an Ape than with a man like the Bp. who made so ill a use of his wonderful speaking powers to try and burke, by a display of authority, a free discussion on what was, or was not, a matter of truth, and reminded him that on questions of physical science 'authority' had always been bowled out by investigation, as witness astronomy and geology. A lot of people afterwards spoke ... the feeling of the meeting was very much against the Bp.

According to Lucas, "Wilberforce, contrary to the central tenet of the legend, did not prejudge the issue", but Lucas is in a minority on this, as Jensen makes clear. Wilberforce criticised Darwin's theory on ostensibly scientific grounds, arguing that it was not supported by the facts, and he noted that the greatest names in science were opposed to the theory.

According to a letter written 30 years later to Francis Darwin, when Huxley heard this he whispered to Brodie, "The Lord hath delivered him into mine hands". Huxley's own contemporary account, in a letter to Henry Dyster on September 9, 1860, makes no mention of this remark. Huxley rose to defend Darwin's theory, finishing his speech with the now-legendary assertion that he was not ashamed to have a monkey for his ancestor, but he would be ashamed to be connected with a man who used great gifts to obscure the truth. Later retellings indicate that this statement had a tremendous effect on the audience, and Lady Brewster is said to have fainted.

Reliable accounts indicate that although Huxley did respond with the "monkey" retort, the remainder of his speech was unremarkable. Balfour Stewart, a prominent scientist and director of the Kew Observatory, wrote afterward that, "I think the Bishop had the best of it." Joseph Dalton Hooker, Darwin's friend and botanical mentor, noted in a letter to Darwin that Huxley had been largely inaudible in the hall:

Well, Sam Oxon got up and spouted for half an hour with inimitable spirit, ugliness and emptiness and unfairness ... Huxley answered admirably and turned the tables, but he could not throw his voice over so large an assembly nor command the audience ... he did not allude to Sam's weak points nor put the matter in a form or way that carried the audience.

Next, Henslow called upon Admiral Robert FitzRoy, who had been Darwin's captain and companion on the voyage of the Beagle twenty-five years earlier. FitzRoy denounced Darwin's book and, "lifting an immense Bible first with both hands and afterwards with one hand over his head, solemnly implored the audience to believe God rather than man". He was believed to have said: "I believe that this is the Truth, and had I known then what I know now, I would not have taken him [Darwin] aboard the Beagle."

The last speaker of the day was Hooker. According to his own account, it was he and not Huxley who delivered the most effective reply to Wilberforce's arguments: "Sam was shut up—had not one word to say in reply, and the meeting was dissolved forthwith". Ruse claims that "everybody enjoyed himself immensely and all went cheerfully off to dinner together afterwards".

It is said that during the debate, two Cambridge dons happened to be standing near Wilberforce, one of whom was Henry Fawcett, the recently blinded economist. Fawcett was asked whether he thought the bishop had actually read the Origin of Species. "Oh no, I would swear he has never read a word of it", Fawcett reportedly replied loudly. Wilberforce swung round to him scowling, ready to recriminate, but stepped back and bit his tongue on noting that the protagonist was the blind economist.

Notably, all three major participants felt they had had the best of the debate. Wilberforce wrote that, "On Saturday Professor Henslow ... called on me by name to address the Section on Darwin's theory. So I could not escape and had quite a long fight with Huxley. I think I thoroughly beat him." Huxley claimed "[I was] the most popular man in Oxford for a full four & twenty hours afterwards." Hooker wrote that "I have been congratulated and thanked by the blackest coats and whitest stocks in Oxford."

== Legacy ==
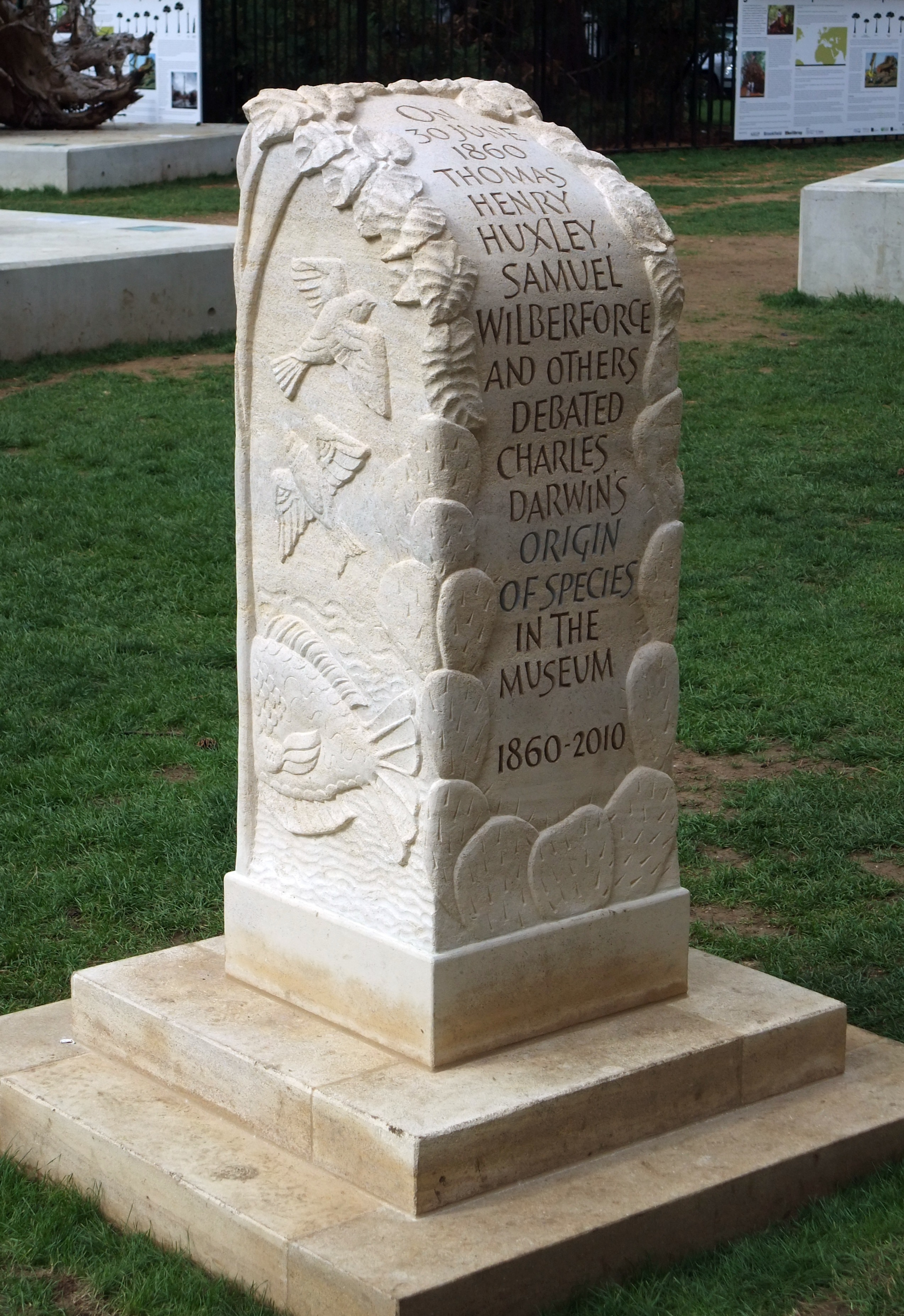
A stone pillar erected in 2010 outside the Oxford University Museum of Natural History to mark the 150th anniversary of the event

Summary reports of the debate were published in The Manchester Guardian, The Athenaeum and Jackson's Oxford Journal. A more detailed report was published by the Oxford Chronicle. Both sides immediately claimed victory, but the majority opinion has always been that the debate represented a major victory for the Darwinians.

Though the debate is frequently depicted as a clash between religion and science, the British Association at the time had a number of clergymen occupying high positions (including Presidents of two of its seven sections). In his speech to open the annual event, the President of the Association (Lord Wrottesley) concluded his talk by saying "Let us ever apply ourselves to the task, feeling assured that the more we thus exercise, and by exercising improve our intellectual faculties, the more worthy shall we be, the better shall we be fitted to come nearer to our God." Therefore, a case could be made for saying that for the many clerics in the audience, the underlying conflict was between traditional Anglicanism (Wilberforce) and liberal Anglicanism (Essays and Reviews). On the other hand, Oxford academic Dr Diane Purkiss says the debate "was really the first time Christianity had ever been asked to square off against science in a public forum in the whole of its history".

The debate has been called "one of the great stories of the history of science" and it is often regarded as a key moment in the acceptance of evolution. However, at the time it received only a few passing references in newspapers, and Brooke argues that "the event almost completely disappeared from public awareness until it was resurrected in the 1890s as an appropriate tribute to a recently deceased hero of scientific education".

The debate began a bitter three-year dispute between Owen and Huxley over human origins, satirised by Charles Kingsley as the "Great Hippocampus Question", which concluded with the defeat of Owen and his backers. The play Darwin in Malibu by Crispin Whittell, was inspired by the debate. A commemorative pillar marks the 150th anniversary of the debate.

== See also ==
- Creation–evolution controversy
- William Henry Flower
- Thomas Henry Huxley
- Alfred Newton
- Scopes Trial
