= After Midnight (Keun novel) =

1937 novel by Irmgard Keun

- First edition cover
- Author: Irmgard Keun
- Original title: Nach Mitternacht
- Translator: James Cleugh; Anthea Bell
- Language: German
- Genre: Political novel
- Set in: Frankfurt am Main, 1936
- Publisher: Querido Verlag
- Publication date: 1937
- Publication place: Netherlands
- English publication date: 1938
- Media type: Print: hardback
- Pages: 236
- Dewey Decimal: 833.912
- LC Class: PT2621.E92 N313
- Preceded by: Das Mädchen, mit dem die Kinder nicht verkehren durften
- Followed by: Third Class Express

After Midnight (German: Nach Mitternacht) is a 1937 novel by Irmgard Keun, set in Frankfurt am Main during the early Nazi period.

== Plot ==
Frankfurt am Main, 1936. Sanna Moder is in love with her cousin Franz, and she and her friends try and enjoy life and what freedom they have in a city and country that is falling deeper under Nazi rule.

== Publication ==
After Midnight was rejected by Keun's Amsterdam-based publisher Allert de Lange, who feared that the book would damage the firm's commercial interests in Germany. Another Amsterdam-based publisher, Querido, would publish the book in 1937. An English edition was published the following year by Alfred A. Knopf, translated by James Cleugh.

== Reception ==
In a 1985 review when it was reprinted, Publishers Weekly said of it, "Much of the material is dated, and the clever repartees, the little ironies seem sadly irrelevant now. Yet Keun's spirited defense of common decency stands out after all this time." In Inside Story, Dr Geoff Wilkes called it "a minor masterpiece of satiric simplicity."

== Adaptations ==
In 1981, After Midnight was adapted into a film, directed by Wolf Gremm and starring Désirée Nosbusch as Sanna.
