= Robert Jungk =

Austrian historian, journalist, and activist (1913–1994)

- Born: Robert Baum; 11 May 1913 Berlin
- Died: 14 July 1994 (aged 81) Salzburg, Austria
- Occupation: Writer, Journalist, Historian, Peace campaigner
- Genre: Non-fiction
- Subject: Nuclear weapons, Future studies, Peace
- Notable works: Brighter than a Thousand Suns: A Personal History of the Atomic Scientists
- Notable awards: Right Livelihood Award (1986)
- Spouse: Ruth Suschitzky (m. 1948)
- Children: Peter Stephan Jungk

Robert Jungk (German: [jʊŋk]; born Robert Baum, also known as Robert Baum-Jungk; 11 May 1913 – 14 July 1994) was an Austrian writer, journalist, historian and peace campaigner. He wrote mostly on matters relating to nuclear weapons.

== Life ==
Jungk was born into a Jewish family in Berlin. His father, known as Max Jungk, was born David Baum in Bohemia.

When Adolf Hitler came to power, Robert Jungk was arrested and released, moved to Paris, then back to Nazi Germany to work in a subversive press service. These activities forced him during World War II to move through various cities including Prague, Paris, and Zürich. After the war, he continued working as a journalist.

His book Brighter than a Thousand Suns: A Personal History of the Atomic Scientists, was the first published account of the Manhattan Project and the German atomic bomb project. Its first Danish edition implied that the German project's workers had been dissuaded from developing a weapon by Werner Heisenberg and his associates, a claim strongly contested by the Danish 1922 Physics Nobel Prize winner Niels Bohr. This led to questions about a 1941 meeting between Bohr and Heisenberg in Copenhagen, Denmark, which became the subject of Michael Frayn's 1998 play Copenhagen.

In 1986 Jungk received the Right Livelihood Award for "struggling indefatigably on behalf of peace, sane alternatives for the future and ecological awareness."

In 1992 he made an unsuccessful bid for the Austrian presidency on behalf of the Green Party.

Jungk died in Salzburg on 14 July 1994.

== Personal life ==
In 1948 Jungk married Ruth Suschitzky (1913–1995). Their son is journalist and writer Peter Stephan Jungk.

== Bibliography ==
- Tomorrow Is Already Here, New York: Simon & Schuster, 1954. Reportage on scientific and technical breakthroughs, a work of nascent dystopian 'futurism'. Much of it was about what developed from the Manhattan Project, as well as things like "electronic brains".
- Brighter than a Thousand Suns: A Personal History of the Atomic Scientists, New York: Harcourt Brace, 1958
- Children of the Ashes, 1st English ed. 1961. About Hiroshima
- The Nuclear State
- The Everyman Project
- Future Workshops

== Recognition ==
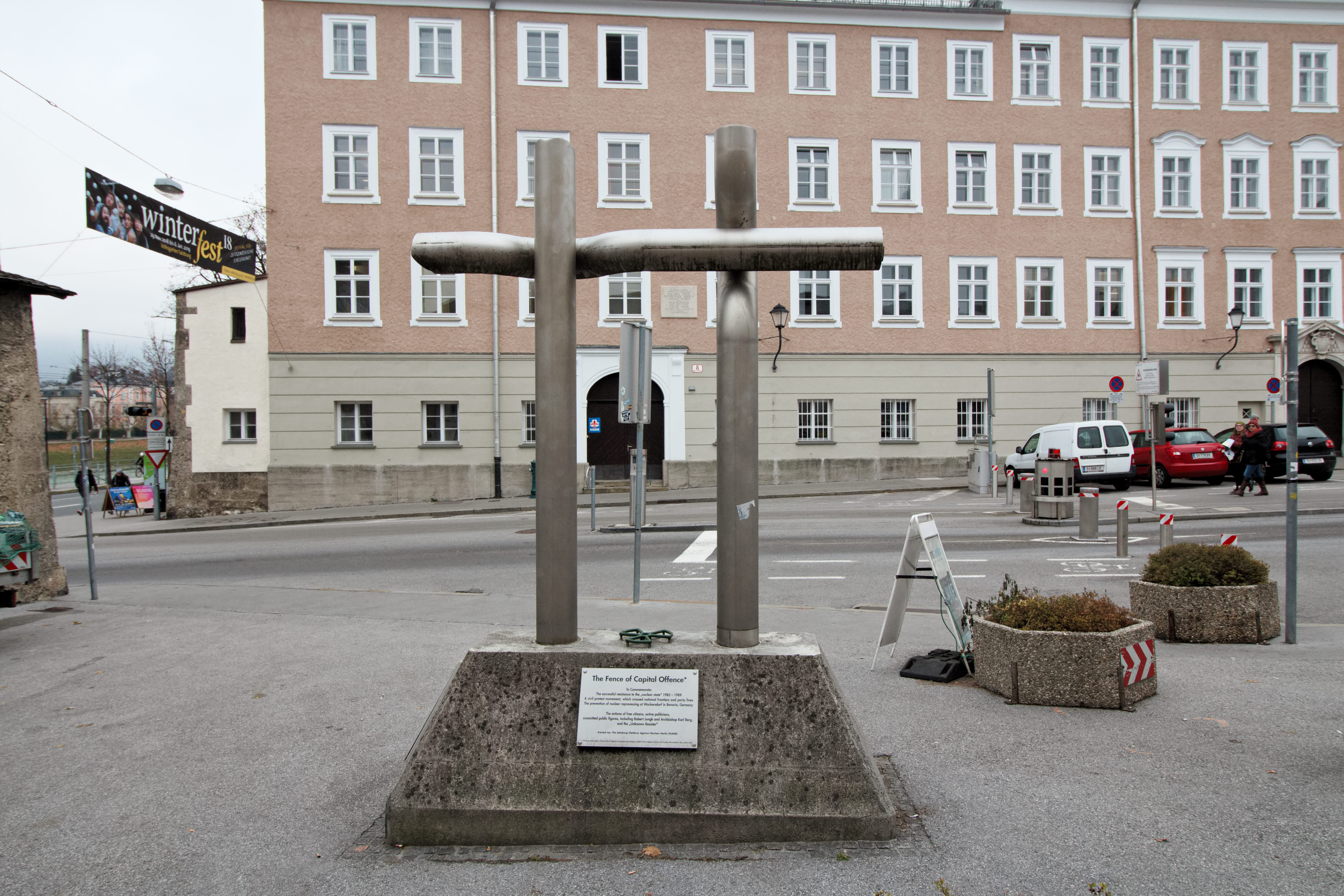
Anti-WAA Memorial on Mozartplatz

- 1970: Honorary Professor at Technische Universität Berlin
- 1986: Right Livelihood Award
- 1989: Honorary Citizen of the City of Salzburg
- 1992: Alternative Büchner Prize
- 1993: Honorary Doctor of the University of Osnabrück
- 1993: Austrian Cross of Honour for Science and Art
- 1993: Salzburg Award for Future Research
- 2000: The anti-Wackersdorf reprocessing plant-monument on Mozartplatz (Salzburg) is, among others also dedicated to him.

== See also ==
- Alexander Sachs (Robert Jungk about the 1939 Szilard–Einstein letter to President Franklin Roosevelt)
