= The High Life (1960 film) =

1960 film directed by Julien Duvivier

- Directed by: Julien Duvivier
- Written by: René Barjavel; Julien Duvivier; Robert A. Stemmle
- Story by: Irmgard Keun
- Produced by: Alf Teichs; Kurt Ulrich
- Starring: Giulietta Masina; Gert Fröbe; Gustav Knuth; Ingrid van Bergen; Joachim Hansen; Hannes Messemer; Friedrich Schoenfelder; Inge Egger; Jan Hendriks; Harry Meyen; Rudolf Platte; Ernst Schröder; Ralf Wolter
- Cinematography: Göran Strindberg
- Edited by: Klaus Eckstein
- Music by: Heino Gaze
- Release date: 16 February 1960 (West Germany)
- Running time: 98 minutes
- Countries: France; West Germany; Italy
- Language: German

The High Life (German: Das kunstseidene Mädchen; French: La Grande Vie) is a 1960 French, West German and Italian film directed by Julien Duvivier. It is based on the novel Das kunstseidene Mädchen (The Artificial Silk Girl) by Irmgard Keun.

== Plot ==
Doris Putzke (Giulietta Masina) is fond of dating men in her quest for finding the perfect one. In her brief relationships, she goes from one disillusionment to another, constantly deluding herself about the intentions of her lovers.

== Cast ==
- Giulietta Masina as Doris Putzke
- Gustav Knuth as Arthur Grönland
- Gert Fröbe as Dr. Kölling
- Harry Meyen as Heinrich
- Robert Dietl as Albert Scherer
- Christiane Maybach as Tilly Scherer
- Friedrich Schoenfelder as Ranowsky
- Ingrid van Bergen as Ulla
- Wolfgang Borchert as Mr. Brenner
- Hilde Volk as Mrs. Brenner
- Albert Bessler as Mr. Onyx
- Inge Egger as Mrs. Onyx
- Hannes Messemer as Ernst Moos
- Rudolf Platte as Karl
- Ralf Wolter as Schlotter
- Ernst Schröder as Mr. Alexander
- Edelweiß Malchin as Mrs. Alexander

== Release ==
The film sold 43,286 tickets in Paris on its first run.

== Analysis ==
Ben McCann in his biography of Duvivier said that the film "remains a minor film in Duvivier's career that is rarely shown today."
