= Indra's Net Theater =

Not-for-profit theater company in Berkeley, California

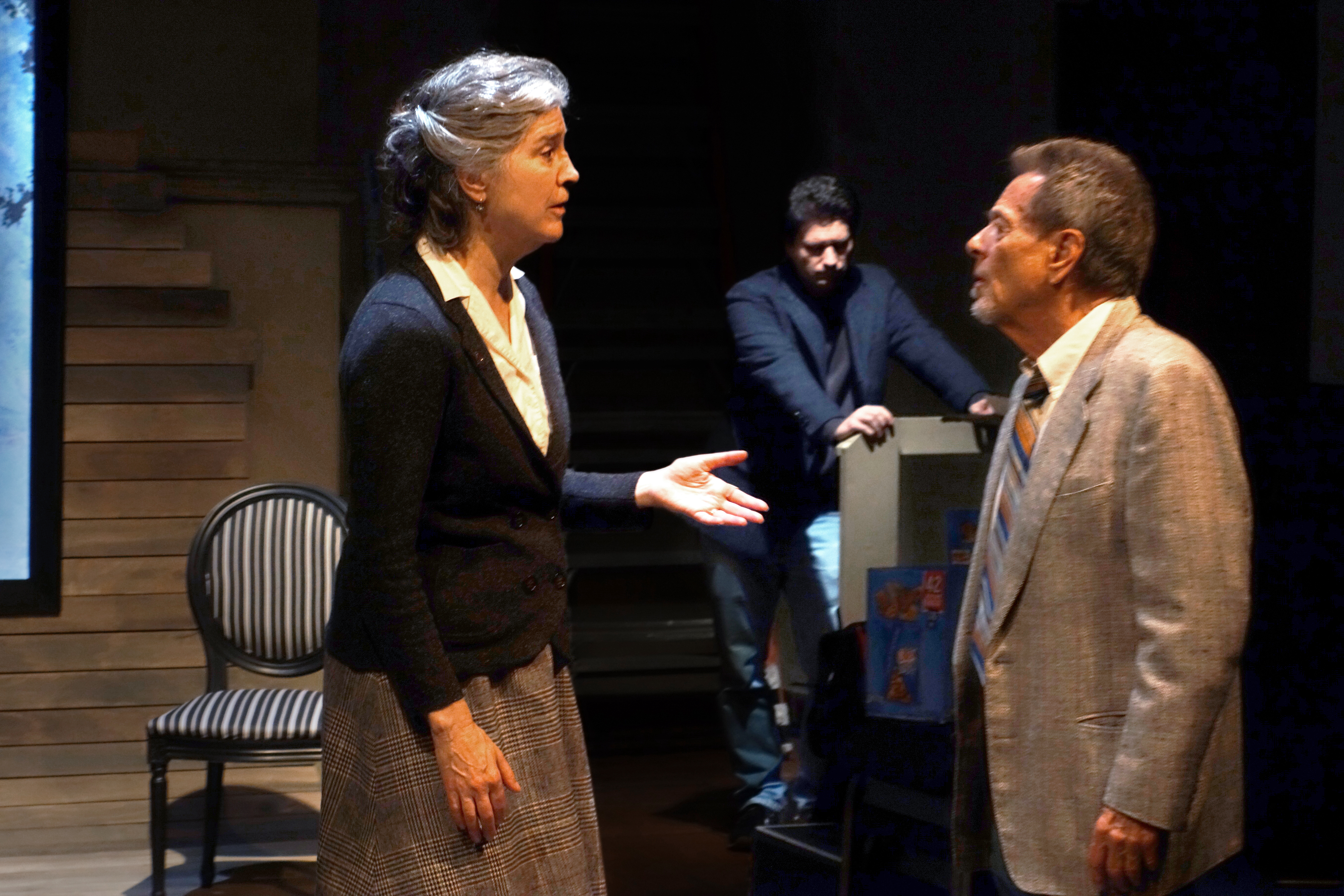
- Indra's Net Theater's 2019 production of Michael Frayn's Copenhagen
- Formation: 2012
- Dissolved: 2020
- Type: Theatre group
- Website: www.indrasnettheater.com

Indra's Net Theater was an award-winning not-for-profit theatre company located in Berkeley, California that focused on plays about science and the deeper questions of life and existence. The company produced new and classic plays, staged readings and special events at various locations in and around Berkeley, CA from 2012 until 2020. They were known for their unique stagings, often including live and/or original music, dance, and visual art.

== History ==
Indra's Net Theater Company was founded in June 2012 by Artistic Director Bruce Coughran and Managing Director Alexandra Frappier. On May 9, 2013, the company produced its first play, Copenhagen by Michael Frayn, at the Osher Studio at Berkeley Central, in Berkeley, California. This was the first time the Tony-winning Copenhagen had been produced in Berkeley.

In their 2014 season, Indra's Net Theater produced Peter Parnell's play QED, about the legendary American physicist Richard Feynman, with actor Jeff Garrett playing Feynman. They also produced a reading of Heinar Kipphardt's In the Matter of J. Robert Oppenheimer, the voluminous history of the Oppenheimer security hearings in 1954.

In 2015, the company produced the first of several world premiere plays, Jennifer Blackmer's Delicate Particle Logic about physicist Lise Meitner. The play was nominated for several Theatre Bay Area Awards including Best World Premiere Play (and the playwright received the 2015 PEN Award.) Next was the world premiere of The Secret of Life by Bruce Coughran. This play explored the history of the two mismatched teams who discovered the structure of DNA in 1953 (Rosalind Franklin and Maurice Wilkins; and Watson and Crick.) It also received several Award nominations including Best Original Script.

The company has also produced Crispin Whittell's Darwin in Malibu (a whimsical take on evolution), and Ira Hauptman's Partition about mathematical genus Srinivasa Ramanujan, in addition to participating in presentations at the Eugene O'Neill Festival in 2014, and the European History of Science Conference in Prague in 2016.

In 2018 came another world premiere, a Time for Hawking about one day in the life of a young Stephen Hawking, written by Bruce Coughran. In 2019 the company again produced Copenhagen (using a newly revised script by Michael Frayn). Both productions garnered Critics Circle awards for Best Overall Production.

== Awards ==
The 2018 production of a Time for Hawking was awarded the Critics Circle Award for “Best Overall Production in the East Bay (theaters under 100 seats)”.

The 2019 production of Copenhagen was awarded three Critics Circle Awards: for Best Principal Actress in a Play (theaters under 100 seats), Best Overall Production (East Bay) and Best Overall Production (Entire Bay Area-Theaters under 100 seats).

In addition to awards for achievement in productions, Indra's Net Theater has also received the following recognition as an organization:

- 2020 Annette Lust Award for Emerging Artists from the San Francisco Bay Area Theatre Critics Circle
- 2018 Proclamation by the City of Berkeley

After the 2019/2020 production of ‘Copenhagen’, Indra’s Net Theater suspended productions during the worldwide COVID pandemic. The company formally closed in 2022, ending 8 years of productions in Berkeley.
