= Irmgard Keun =

German author

- Cover of the Spanish-language edition of Keun's novel The Artificial Silk Girl showing a photo of her in the 1930s.
- Born: 6 February 1905; Charlottenburg, Kingdom of Prussia, German Empire
- Died: 5 May 1982 (aged 77); Cologne, North Rhine-Westphalia, West Germany
- Resting place: Melaten cemetery, Cologne
- Education: Berlitz school
- Occupation: author
- Spouse: Johannes Tralow (m. 1932–div. 1937)
- Partner: Joseph Roth
- Children: 1
- Writing career
- Language: German
- Period: 1931–1962
- Notable works: The Artificial Silk Girl, After Midnight
- Movement: New Objectivity
- Website: www.penguin.co.uk/authors/31786/irmgard-keun.html

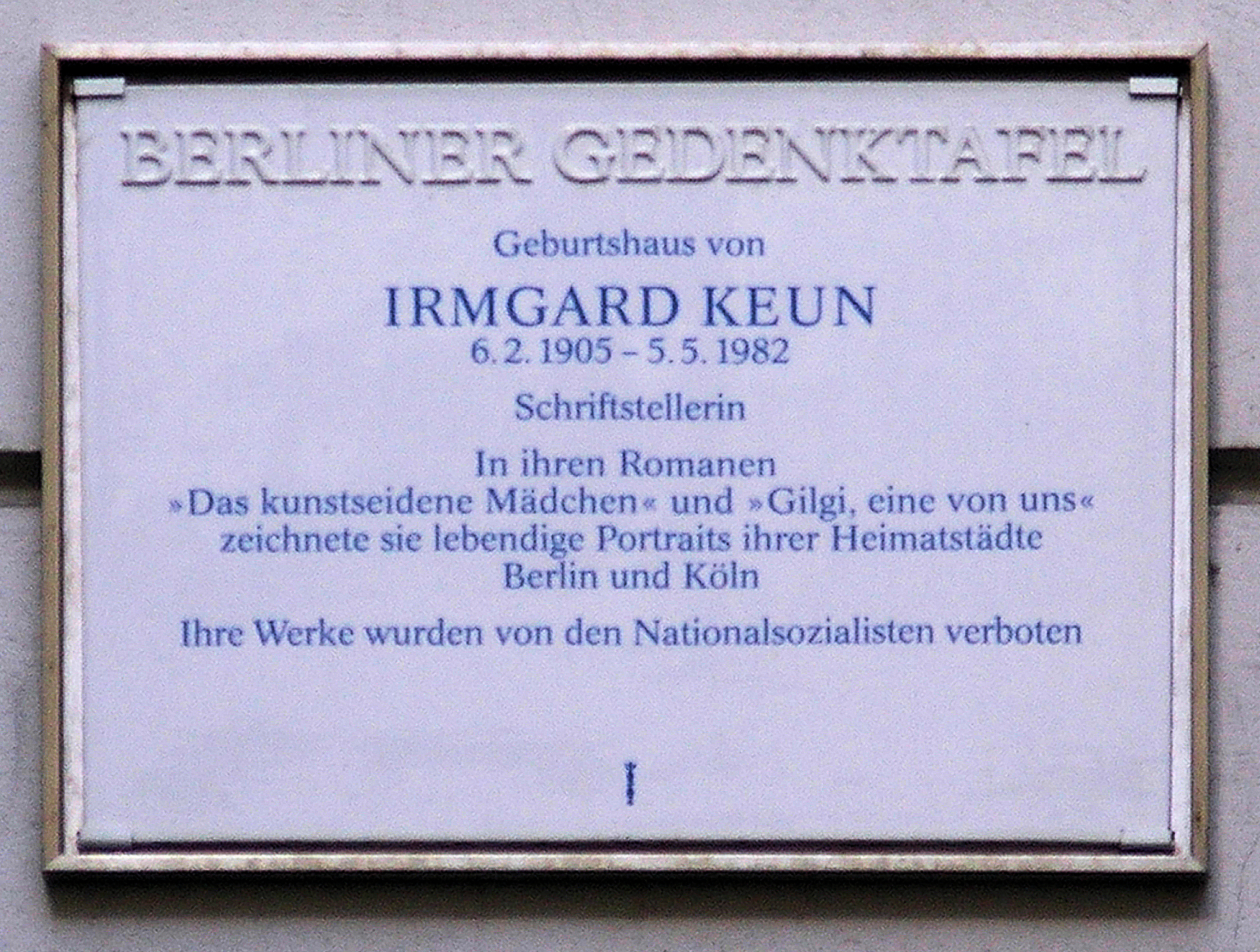
Memorial plaque, Meinekestraße 6, Berlin

Irmgard Keun ([ˈɪʁmɡaʁt ˈkɔɪ̯n]; 6 February 1905 – 5 May 1982) was a German novelist. Noted for her portrayals of the life of women, she is described as "often reduced to the bold sexuality of her writing, [yet] a significant author of the late Weimar period and die Neue Sachlichkeit." She was born into an affluent family and was given the autonomy to explore her passions. After her attempts at acting ended at the age of 16, Keun began working as a writer after years of working in Hamburg and Greifswald. Her books were banned by Nazi authorities but gained recognition during the final years of her life.

== Biography ==
Irmgard Keun was born on 6 February 1905 in Charlottenburg (at the time an independent town, now part of Berlin) to Eduard and Elsa Keun. Her father was an agent for a company that imported petrol, her mother a housewife. Keun later recalled her mother as "stark hausfraulich eingestellt, auf eine sehr schauerliche Weise" (quite domestically inclined, in a very horrible way). She and her family, including her brother Gerd, born in 1910, lived in the city until 1913, when they moved to Cologne. There Keun attended a Lutheran girls' school, from which she graduated in 1921. She worked as a stenotypist, but also attended acting school in Cologne from 1925 until 1927. Although she had stage roles in Greifswald and Hamburg, these were only somewhat successful, and she decided to abandon her acting career in 1929. Encouraged by Alfred Döblin, she turned to writing. (Note: Much of Keun's biography is shrouded in mystery - or mystification - considerably by her own making. During the course of her life she told numerous stories, many of which have been debunked, while, on the other hand, some seemingly unlikely episodes turned out to be true - or at least feasible. Her biographer Hiltrud Häntzschel states: "Irmgard Keun hatte zur Wahrheit ihrer Lebensumstände ein ganz spezielles Verhältnis: mal aufrichtig, mal leichtsinnig, mal erfinderisch aus Sehnsucht nach Erfolg, mal phantasievoll aus Lust, unehrlich aus Not, mal verschwiegen aus Schonung." ('Irmgard Keun had a very special relationship with the facts of her life: sometimes she was straight-forward, sometimes careless, sometimes inventive because she longed for success, sometimes willfully inventive, dishonest out of necessity, sometimes discreet to protect.') Consequently all biographical statements based on her own statements have to be treated with great caution.)

In 1931 Keun's first novel Gilgi, eine von uns was published and became a success. In 1932 a second novel Das kunstseidene Mädchen (The Artificial Silk Girl) came out. Although there were allegations that she had plagiarised a novel by Robert Neumann (a claim endorsed by her erstwhile promoter Kurt Tucholsky – and disproven only much later), this novel also became a success.

In 1932, Keun married the writer and director Johannes Tralow. They divorced in 1937. After 1945, she claimed that this had been because he was a Nazi sympathizer; however, there is evidence that she stayed in close touch with him well after 1933, and that the reasons may have been much more personal in nature.

In 1933/34, her books were confiscated and banned by the Nazis. In the spring of 1933 she met and fell in love with Arnold Strauss, a Jewish doctor who wanted to treat her for her alcoholism. Strauss, as a Jew, lost his position at the Berlin hospital that employed him and went to the USA in 1935; however, they stayed in touch (and many of their letters survive). Keun continued to publish in Germany after 1935, occasionally using pseudonyms, but after she was finally banned from publishing by the authorities - and after she had tried to sue the government for loss of income, and her final appeal to be admitted to Reich Chamber of Literature was refused - she went into exile to Belgium and later the Netherlands in 1936. Between sometime in 1936 and 1938 she lived with writer Joseph Roth, while, at the same time pursuing her relationship with Strauss in the US. Invited by Strauss, she even visited him in Norfolk, Virginia in 1938, yet returned to Europe that same year. In 1940 she returned to Cologne from the Netherlands, where she lived through the war years using an alias. How she managed to do this remains unclear. Keun claimed she seduced a Nazi official in the Netherlands and, however that may be, her cover back in Germany may have been helped by the fact that the British Daily Telegraph (among others) reported her suicide in Amsterdam on 16 August 1940.

She counted among her friends such literary notables as Egon Erwin Kisch, Hermann Kesten, Stefan Zweig, Ernst Toller, Ernst Weiss, and Heinrich Mann. From 1936 to 1938, she had the already mentioned romantic relationship with Joseph Roth, a relationship that at first had a positive effect on her literary output. She worked together with Roth, traveling with him to various cities such as Paris, Wilna, Lemberg, Warsaw, Vienna, Salzburg, Brussels and Amsterdam. After the German invasion of the Netherlands, she returned in 1940 to Nazi Germany. Protected by false reports of her own suicide, she lived there undercover until 1945.

In the 1960s, her life was overshadowed by alcoholism and homelessness in spite of help from the literary community. In 1966, she was put under tutelage and committed to the psychiatric ward at the Bonn State Hospital, where she remained until 1972. In 1977, she was re-discovered after an article in Stern magazine. From 1979 onwards, her financial situation recovered thanks to new editions of her work. She died in Cologne in 1982 of lung cancer.

== Response to her work ==
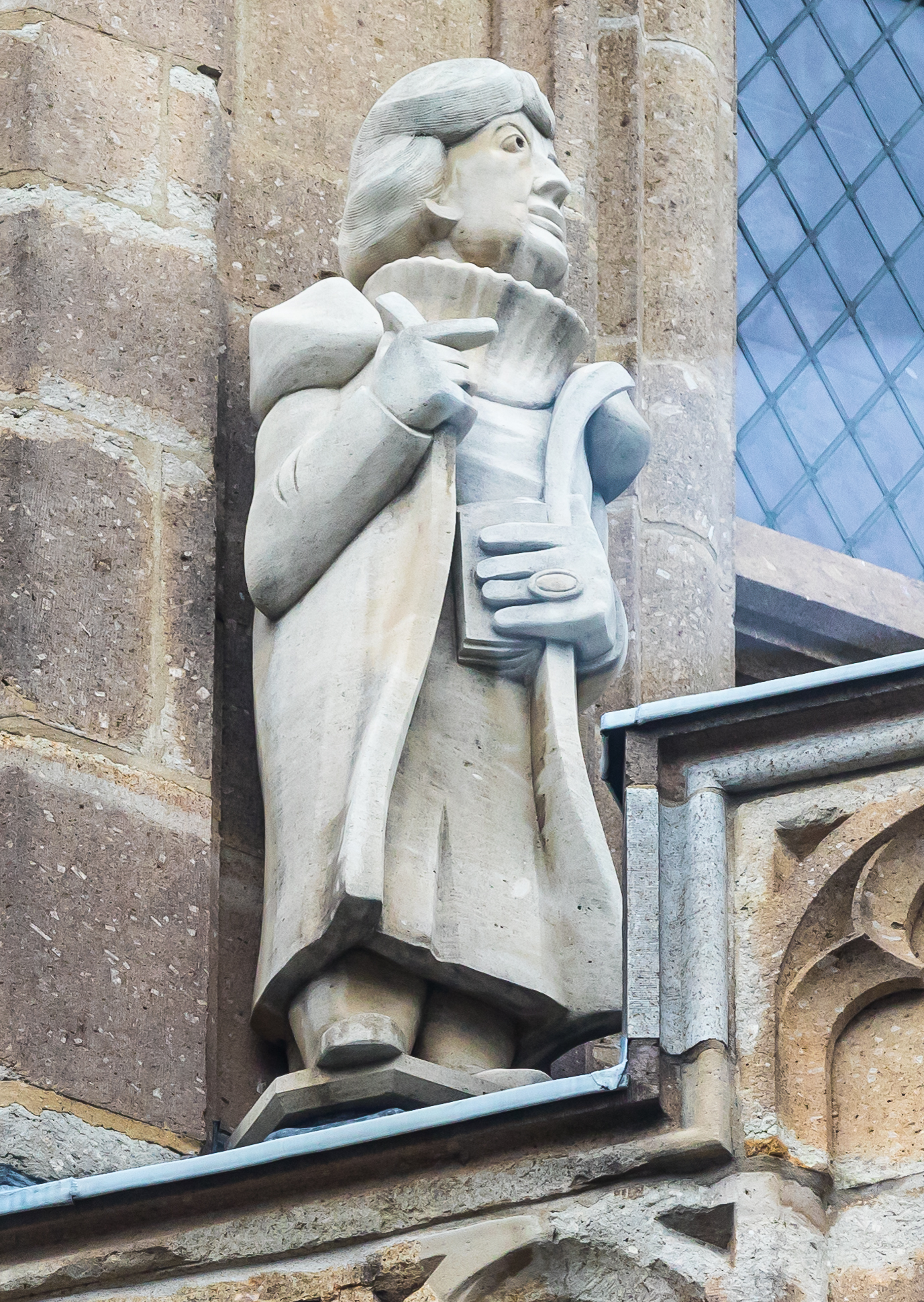
Sculpture of Keun on Cologne City Hall

Keun received great acclaim for her sharp-witted books, most notably from such well-known authors as Alfred Döblin and Kurt Tucholsky, who said about her, "A woman writer with humor, check this out!". Keun utilizes her characters from her novels to highlight and critique the social problems of the early 1930s. Keun's biggest criticisms of consumerism and the complexity of a feminine identity are displayed through the female protagonists' relationships with men. Breaking the archetypal mold, Keun's characters offer depth to the feminine identity and challenge the idea that a woman must be placed into a category. For example, "Keun's representative novels of the New Woman's experience during the Weimar Republic, Gilgi—eine von uns (1931) and Das kunstseidene Mädchen (1932), feature two such young stylized New Women, Gilgi and Doris, who try to shape their lives in the aforementioned image by taking their cues from the popular media". In the case of Das kunstseidene Mädchen (The Artificial Silk Girl), Keun tells the story from Doris' perspective, which she does to give the reader "insights into the social injustice of Weimar Berlin's class and gender hierarchy". Keun's novel reflects critically on these discourses by casting its heroine's sentimental journey in terms of an education in vision.

In an interview, Keun's daughter, Martina Keun-Geburtig, answered the question if her mother was a happy woman, "Well, she always said that the Nazis took her best years. Starting in 1933 her success was abruptly ended through the book-burning up until '45, '46. It's a pretty long time…".

== Bibliography ==
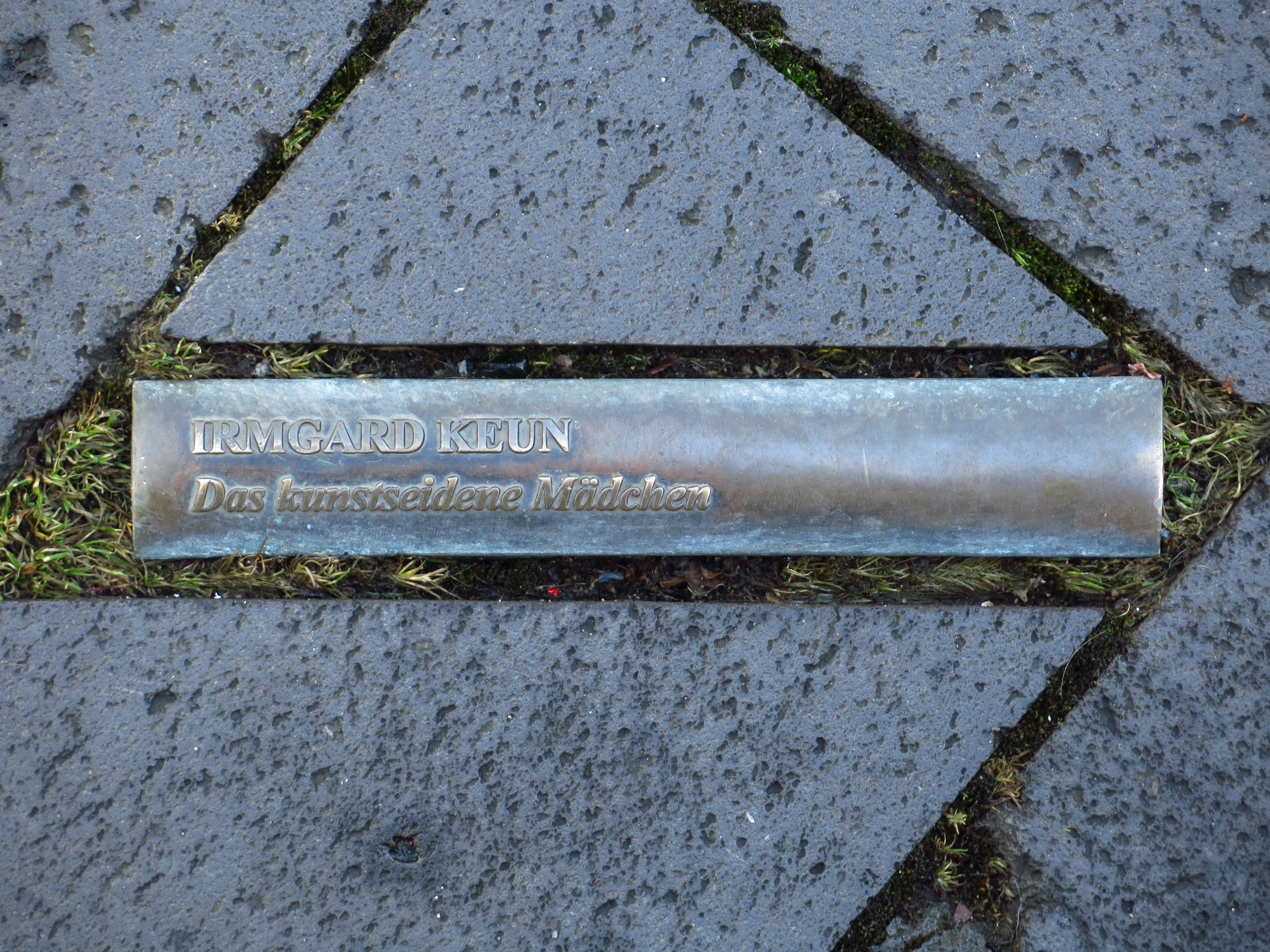
A Buchdenkmal in Bonn honouring The Artificial Silk Girl

- Gilgi, eine von uns (1931), novel, translated into English as Gilgi, One of Us
- Das kunstseidene Mädchen (1932), novel, translated into English as The Artificial Silk Girl
- Das Mädchen, mit dem die Kinder nicht verkehren durften (1936), teenage novel, translated into English as Grown-ups Don't Understand (UK) and The Bad Example (US)
- Nach Mitternacht (1937), novel, translated into English as After Midnight
- D-Zug dritter Klasse (1938), novel (Third Class Express)
- Kind aller Länder (1938), novel, translated into English as Child of All Nations
- Bilder und Gedichte aus der Emigration (1947) (Pictures and poems of emigration)
- Nur noch Frauen... (1949) (Only women left)
- Ich lebe in einem wilden Wirbel. Letters to Arnold Strauss, 1933-1947 (1988)
- Ferdinand, der Mann mit dem freundlichen Herzen (1950), novel, translated into English as Ferdinand, the Man with the Kind Heart
- Scherzartikel (1951) (Joke object)
- Wenn wir alle gut wären (1954), Short stories, translated into English as If we were all good
- Blühende Neurosen (1962) (Neuroses in full flower)

== Filmography ==
- Eine von uns, directed by Johannes Meyer (1932, based on the novel Gilgi, eine von uns)
- The High Life, directed by Julien Duvivier (1960, based on the novel Das kunstseidene Mädchen)
- After Midnight, directed by Wolf Gremm (1981, based on the novel Nach Mitternacht)
- Waterbomb for the Fat Tomcat, directed by Varis Brasla (2004, based on the novel Das Mädchen, mit dem die Kinder nicht verkehren durften)

== Sources ==
- Stefanie Arend, Ariane Martin (Ed.): Irmgard Keun 1905/2005. Deutungen und Dokumente. Aisthesis Verlag, Bielefeld 2005, ISBN 3-89528-478-5.
- Carmen Bescansa: Gender- und Machttransgression im Romanwerk Irmgard Keuns. (Mannheimer Studien zur Literatur- und Kulturwissenschaft; vol. 42). Röhrig Verlag, St. Ingbert 2007, ISBN 978-3-86110-424-7.
- Heike Beutel, Anna Barbara Hagin (Ed.): Irmgard Keun. Zeitzeugen, Bilder und Dokumente erzählen. Emons, Köln 1995, ISBN 3-924491-48-8.
- Hiltrud Häntzschel: Irmgard Keun. Rowohlt, Reinbek 2001, ISBN 3-499-50452-9.
- Ingrid Marchlewitz: Irmgard Keun. Leben und Werk. Königshausen & Neumann, Würzburg 1999, ISBN 3-8260-1621-1.
- Liane Schüller: Vom Ernst der Zerstreuung. Schreibende Frauen am Ende der Weimarer Republik: Marieluise Fleißer, Irmgard Keun und Gabriele Tergit. Aisthesis Verlag, Bielefeld 2005, ISBN 3-89528-506-4.
- Volker Weidermann: Das Buch der verbrannten Bücher. Kiepenheuer & Witsch, Köln 2008; ISBN 978-3-462-03962-7. (For Keun see pages 188-191)
