= Twisted Tales (British TV series) =

2005 British comedy drama television series

- Genre: Comedy drama Horror
- Directed by: Andy Goddard; Crispin Whittell; Susan Tully; Jonathan Gershfield
- Theme music composer: Willie Dowling
- Country of origin: United Kingdom
- Original language: English
- No. of series: 1
- No. of episodes: 14

Production
- Executive producer: Sophie Clarke-Jervoise
- Producers: Bill Dare; Gabbie Asher; Arabella McGuigan
- Running time: 30 minutes

Original release
- Network: BBC Three
- Release: 16 January – 19 April 2005

Related
- Spine Chillers

Twisted Tales is a British comedy-horror anthology television series written by a mix of established writers and upcoming talent that aired on BBC Three from January to April 2005. It consisted of fourteen self-contained episodes with a mysterious twist and had the same format as a previous BBC Three series of six comedy-horror stories, Spine Chillers (2003).

The cast included up-and-coming comedians, such as Catherine Tate, Nick Frost, Marcus Brigstocke, Steve Edge and more, among distinguished actors like Alison Steadman, Paul Darrow, Mary Tamm, Phil Cornwell, Doon Mackichan and Annette Badland. The comedy duo Mitchell and Webb, best known for the Channel 4 sitcom Peep Show, both wrote and starred in the ninth episode "Nothing to Fear".

== Production ==
Directors Andy Goddard and Crispin Whittell shot four episodes of the series each, while Susan Tully and Jonathan Gershfield directed three episodes each.

Simon Lacey composed the music for all four episodes directed by Whittell: "Charlie's Angel", "The Irredeemable Brain of Dr Heinrich Hunsecker", "Whacked" and "The Patter of Tiny Feet".

== Episodes ==
No.	Title	Directed by	Written by	Original release date
1	"txt msg rcvd"	Andy Goddard	Nev Fountain and Tom Jamieson	16 January 2005
Alex is a travelling sales trainer who seems to have everything he wants - that is, until a cryptic text message causes events to spin out of control. Cast : Marc Warren as Alex, Nick Frost as Keith and Zoe Telford as Davina. Also appearing is the voice of Paul McGann.
2	"Flat Four"	Andy Goddard	Cris Cole	23 January 2005
When Joey loses a briefcase containing the details of a major deal, it looks as if all is lost until he takes a room in Mrs Templeman's house. But his real problems are only just starting. Cast : Andrew Lee Potts as Joey, Mary Tamm as Mrs Templeman and Paul Darrow as fellow tenant Mr De Vere. Cameo appearances are made by Kevin Eldon and Kate Fleetwood.
3	"Charlie's Angel"	Crispin Whittell	Jonathan Harvey	30 January 2005
After mourning the death of boyfriend Sam, Charlie is ready to move on. If only Sam would let him. Cast : Matthew Delamere as Charlie, Antony Cotton as Sam and Philip Olivier as Iggy
4	"Guardian"	Andy Goddard	Susan Nickson	6 February 2005
A near-fatal attack leaves Kelly's spirit in limbo between this world and the next, where the rights and wrongs of her life flash before her. Cast : Mark Benton as Trev and Samantha Power as Kelly
5	"Death Metal Chronicles"	Andy Goddard	David Cummings	13 February 2005
Rivalry and a radical change of direction for a death-metal band results in the murder of one of the members. Cast : Morwenna Banks as Inspector Pierson, Steve Oram as her deputy and Ricky Grover as the band's roadie, Maggot. The band include Rafe Spall and Simon Woods.
6	"Vacant Possession"	Jonathan Gershfield	Nick Vivian	20 February 2005
A property developer gets his comeuppance when his unscrupulous business practices catch up with him in the form of some aggrieved builders. Cast : Marcus Brigstocke as Rick and Sandra Huggett as Jane
7	"The Irredeemable Brain of Dr Heinrich Hunsecker"	Crispin Whittell	Ben Teasdale	27 February 2005
Darren is totally unprepared for the consequences when he inherits a mysterious sealed jar from a distant wealthy relative. Cast : Bruce Mackinnon as Darren, Emma Pierson as Jane and Jay Villiers as the voice of Dr Heinrich Hunsecker
8	"Whacked"	Crispin Whittell	Simon J. Ashford	6 March 2005
A group of friends are set to become millionaires following an offer to buy out their computer gaming company. All that is standing in their way is the company's founder Doc, who is becoming increasingly involved in a new game based on an ancient and mysterious book. Cast : Phil Cornwell as Doc and Steve Edge as Trax
9	"Nothing to Fear"	Susan Tully	David Mitchell and Robert Webb	15 March 2005
Two apparently fearless friends get more than they bargained for when they spend a weekend at a tacky country inn billed as "the scariest guesthouse in Britain". Cast : David Mitchell as Ray and Robert Webb as Colin
10	"Cursed House"	Susan Tully	David Cummings	22 March 2005
A fading and broke television psychiatrist conducts an experiment on some old university friends in a bid to launch his own successful reality TV format. But things do not go according to plan. Cast : Adrian Edmondson as Ed, Doon Mackichan as Sandra, Janet Dibley as Carolyn, Robbie Gee as Harry and Shane Connor as Ben
11	"The Patter of Tiny Feet"	Crispin Whittell	David Cairns and Fiona Watson	29 March 2005
A mysterious stranger makes a childless couple's wish for a baby come true, but their dream of blissful parenthood soon becomes a nightmare. Cast : Catherine Tate as Wendy, Sean Foley as Damien, Paola Dionisotti as Rosemary and Rupert Vansittart as Dr Mantle
12	"Murder Me"	Jonathan Gershfield	Sam Lawrence	5 April 2005
Harry finds he is terminally ill and hires an assassin to kill him. The diagnosis turns out to be false but can Harry call off the killer before it's too late? Cast : Nitin Ganatra as Harry, Keith Allen as G.R. and Raquel Cassidy as Lynne
13	"The Magister"	Susan Tully	Ben Teasdale	12 April 2005
An aspiring film producer convinces a reclusive horror legend to complete his most notorious film. Has she bitten off more than she can chew? Cast : Victoria Hamilton as Jessie, John Bowe as Kurt and Shelley King as Larissa
14	"Fruitcake of the Living Dead"	Jonathan Gershfield	Simon J. Ashford	19 April 2005
A home-made fruitcake competition proves deadly for the rival contenders. Cast : Alison Steadman as Margery, Jan Francis as Penny and Annette Badland as Bunty

== Reception ==
While reviewing the first episode of the series for The Times, Angus Batey said, "The excellent cast seems unsure whether it's supplying chuckles or chills, but the format – essentially Tales of the Unexpected for the 21st century – has potential". Another critic from the newspaper, David Chater, noticed the same flaw in the tenth episode, stating that the tale "can't seem to make up its mind whether to play for laughs or shocks" and has a "queasy tone". He did, however, praise Doon Mackichan's performance in the episode, saying that she "shines" as Ed's hysterical wife Sandra. The sixth episode, titled "Vacant Possession", was described in The Times as "marvellously dark", while the final one was called "risible".

The streaming version of Spine Chillers (2003) available on Prime Video and Tubi combines that show as season one and the first eight episodes of Twisted Tales as the second season.
