= James Cleugh =

English author and translator

James Cleugh (/klʌf/; 1891 – 7 July 1969) was an English writer and translator.

He established the Aquila Press in the 1930s to publish obscure but literary works. He personally wrote or translated over 50 books.

== Bibliography ==
- Love Locked Out: A Survey of Love, Licence and Restriction in the Middle Ages, Anthony Blond, Ltd., 1963
- Spain in the Modern World, 1953
- Krupps: The Story of an Industrial Empire by Gert Von Klass, and translated into English by James Cleugh. Black and white plates which include members of the Krupp family
- Captain Thomas Johnstone, 1772-1839: Smuggler's Reach, Andrew Melrose, London, 1955
- Brighter than a Thousand Suns: A Personal History of the Atomic Scientists, Robert Jungk, translated into English by James Cleugh, Harcourt, New York, 1956
- Image of Spain, Harrap 1961
- I looked for Adam: the story of man's search for his ancestors, Herbert Wendt, translated by James Cleugh. Weidenfeld & Nicolson, 1957
- The Divine Aretino, Anthony Blond, Ltd., 1965; Stein and Day, 1966
