= Stefan Rozental =

Polish nuclear physicist

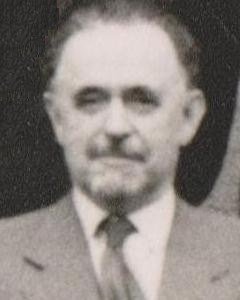
Stefan Rozental, 1963 at Copenhagen

Stefan Rozental (13 August 1903, Łódź – 2 August 1994, Copenhagen), was a nuclear physicist, specialising in quantum mechanics. Trapped outside Poland when World War I started, he and his parents ended up in Denmark and spent four years from 1915 there before they returned to their native Poland in 1919 after the war. He received his PhD from the University of Kraków in 1928.

He later held an assistant position with Werner Heisenberg in Leipzig between 1929 and 1934 and lectured in Kraków between 1934 and 1938. Due to the rising Antisemitism in Poland he emigrated to Denmark and arrived in Copenhagen in March 1938 where Niels Bohr admitted him to his institute. From 1940, after Hendrik Anthony Kramers (from 1916) and Léon Rosenfeld (from 1934), he was Niels Bohr's personal assistant for almost fifteen years, whom he assisted even into the early sixties after both returned to Copenhagen in 1945.

== Literature ==
- Stefan Rozental, ed., Niels Bohr: His Life and Work As Seen by His Friends and Colleagues, John Wiley & Sons, 1964.
- Stefan Rozental, Schicksalsjahre mit Niels Bohr, DVA, 1991.
  (This is a German translation of Rozental's Danish account NB - erindringer om Niels Bohr of his years with Niels Bohr, published 1985 in Kopenhagen. No English translation available.)
