= Alexander Sachs =

American economist

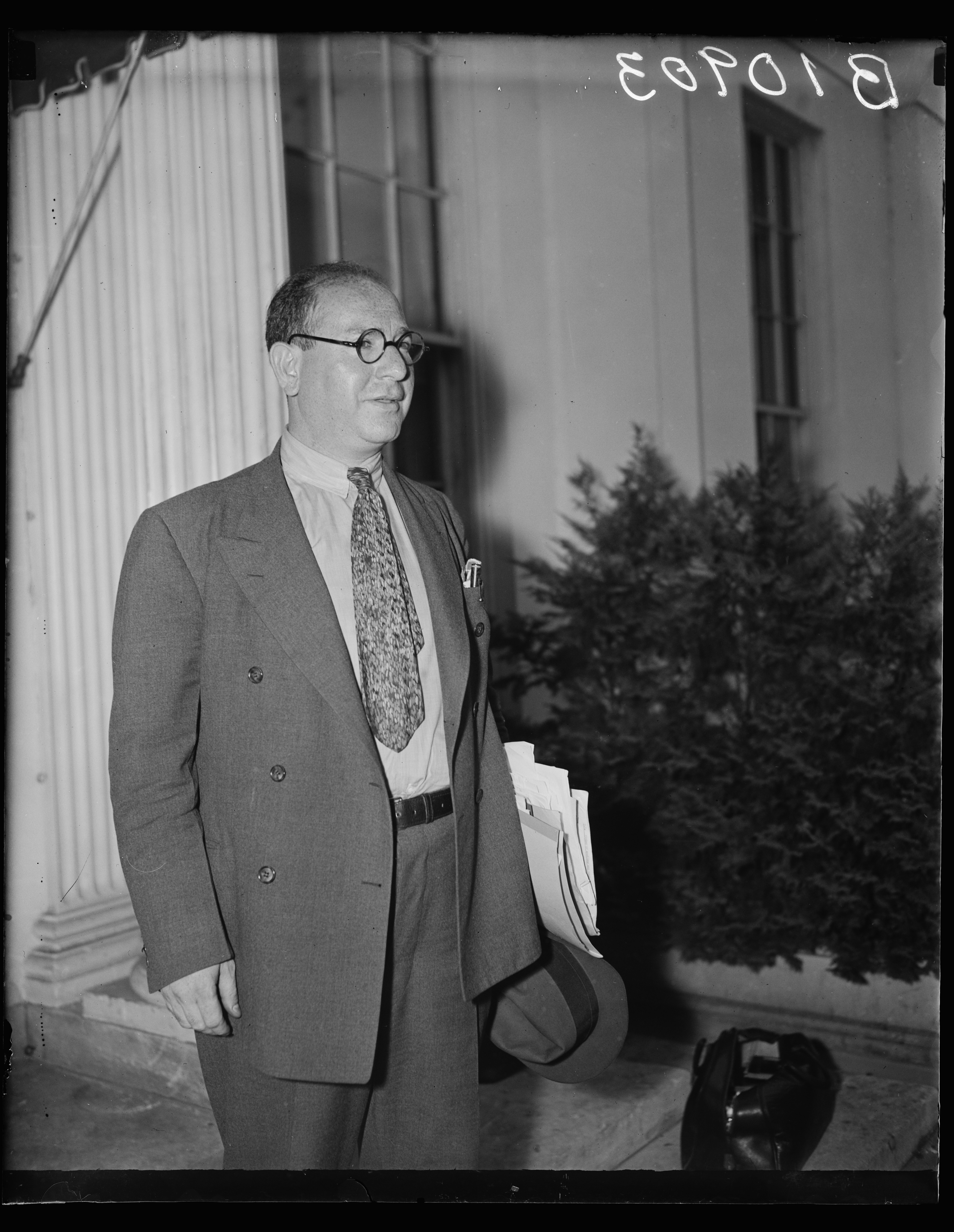
- Sachs in 1936
- Born: August 1, 1893; Rossien, Russian Empire
- Died: June 23, 1973 (aged 79)
- Education: Townsend Harris High School; City College of New York; Columbia College, Columbia University
- Occupations: Economist; banker
- Spouse: Charlotte Cramer Sachs
- Parent(s): Samuel Sachs; Sarah Sachs

Alexander Sachs (August 1, 1893 – June 23, 1973) was an American economist and banker. In October 1939 he delivered the Einstein–Szilard letter to President Franklin D. Roosevelt, suggesting that nuclear-fission research ought to be pursued with a view to possibly constructing nuclear weapons, should they prove feasible, in view of the likelihood that Nazi Germany would do so. This led to the initiation of the United States' Manhattan Project.

== Life and career ==
Born in Rossien, Russian Empire (now Raseiniai, Lithuania) to Samuel and Sarah Sachs, Alexander moved to the U.S. in 1904 to join his brother, Joseph A. Sachs. He was educated at Townsend Harris High School, City College of New York, and Columbia College, Columbia University, all in New York City.

In 1913, he joined the municipal bond department at Boston-based investment bank Lee, Higginson & Co. but in 1915 returned to education as a graduate student in social sciences, philosophy, and jurisprudence at Harvard College. In later life, he was on the faculty at Princeton University.

Between 1918 and 1921 he was an aide to Justice Louis Brandeis and the Zionist Organization of America on international problems of the Middle East and the World War I peace conference.

From 1922 to 1929 he was economist and investment analyst for Walter Eugene Meyer in equity investment acquisitions. He then organized and became director of Economics Investment Research at the Lehman Corporation, a newly established investment company of Lehman Brothers. In 1931 he joined the board at Lehman. He was vice president from 1936 to 1943, remaining on the board until his death at the age of 79.

In 1933, Sachs served as organizer and chief of the economic research division of the National Recovery Administration. In 1936 he served on the National Policy Committee. During the war, he was economic adviser to the Petroleum Industry War Council and special counsel to the director of the Office of Strategic Services.

In 1971, Sachs received the American Academy of Achievement's Golden Plate Award at a dinner ceremony in Philadelphia, Pennsylvania.

== Family ==
He was married to German-born artist, inventor, and entrepreneur, Charlotte Cramer Sachs (1907–2004).

== Atomic bomb ==
Sachs was a friend and confidant of U.S. President Franklin Roosevelt, part of an inner circle of influential but unofficial advisors from whom the president liked to seek counsel. In this capacity, he served a critical role in catalyzing Roosevelt's support for what would eventually become the Manhattan Project.

In July 1939, atomic physicists Leo Szilard and Eugene Wigner approached Albert Einstein to seek his help in communicating with the government of Belgium. At the time, the goal was not yet to press for an American atomic bomb project, but to prevent the Nazi government in Germany from developing their own. Szilard and Wigner wanted to urge the Belgian authorities to hide, or transfer, their supply of uranium, which was the most substantial in Europe due to Belgium's control of uranium mines in their colony in the Congo. They sought Einstein's help because of his prestige, and his connections with the Belgian royal family.

After Einstein agreed to put his signature on such a letter to the Belgians, Szilard approached Sachs, whom he knew personally, to help win approval for the letter from the U.S. State Department. (These events, which would prove so fateful for the world at large, have been examined minutely by historians - some accounts credit Sachs with the idea of approaching Einstein in the first place.)

Sachs decided that the most effective strategy would be to take the letter to Roosevelt himself, and to do it personally. Working with Sachs, Szilard re-drafted the appeal to include a request for the government to help obtain funding and support for American atomic research. Einstein signed an elaborated draft of the letter, which was then passed to Sachs.

Sachs's own accounts of his meetings with Roosevelt are recounted in Brighter Than A Thousand Suns, Robert Jungk's seminal history of the development of atomic science.

By this account, Sachs met with Roosevelt twice - first on October 11, 1939, six weeks after the war had begun in Europe. Sachs presented the Einstein-Szilard letter and accompanying materials, including a memorandum of his own. He read the materials aloud to Roosevelt, but the president was not persuaded that the U.S. government should get involved. Sachs managed to get an invitation to breakfast the next morning, and spent a sleepless night trying to conceive how he might persuade the president to support the plan.

When he returned to the White House the next day, October 12, Sachs said, he told the president the following story:

During the Napoleonic wars a young American inventor came to the French emperor and offered to build a fleet of steamships with the help of which Napoleon could, in spite of the uncertain weather, land in England. Ships without sails? This seemed to the great Corsican so impossible that he sent [Robert] Fulton away.... Had Napoleon shown more imagination and humility at that time, the history of the nineteenth century would have taken a different course.

According to Sachs, after considering the implication of this tale, FDR called for an aide to bring a bottle of brandy from Napoleon's time, which he poured into two glasses for himself and Sachs.

Then the president remarked, "Alex, what you are after is to see that the Nazis don't blow us up?" Sachs replied, "Precisely." Roosevelt turned to his attache, General Edwin "Pa" Watson, and declared, "Pa, this requires action!"

In December 1944, Sachs later reported, he met again with president Roosevelt on the subject of the atomic bomb, this time for the purpose of establishing a moral and appropriate plan for the bomb's first use. According to Sachs, this plan included a demonstration of an atomic detonation for representatives of allied and neutral countries, followed by another demonstration explosion, this time on enemy soil, after a warning to fully evacuate the target area. Whether or not FDR actually agreed to this plan, there is no evidence that he formally introduced it into the preparations for the use of the atomic weapons. Early in 1945, the panel of scientists and civilian leaders known as the "Interim Committee" ruled out demonstrations in favor of an atomic attack.
