= Brighter than a Thousand Suns (book) =

1956 book by Robert Jungk

Brighter than a Thousand Suns: A Personal History of the Atomic Scientists
- Author: Robert Jungk
- Subject: Manhattan Project
- Publisher: Harcourt, Brace
- Publication date: 1956

Brighter than a Thousand Suns: A Personal History of the Atomic Scientists, by Austrian Robert Jungk, is an early history of the Manhattan Project and the German atomic bomb project.

== History ==
The book studied the making and dropping of the atomic bomb from the viewpoints of the atomic scientists. The book is largely based on personal interviews with persons who played leading parts in the construction and deployment of the bombs.

The book first appeared in the fall of 1956, when it was serialized in 47 installments in a West German newspaper. It then appeared in book form by Alfred Scherz Verlag with the title Heller als tausend Sonnen. James Cleugh translated it into English, and it was published in 1958 by Harcourt, Brace and Company.

The book's title is based on the verse from the Bhagavad Gita that J. Robert Oppenheimer is said to have recalled at the Trinity nuclear test.

== Controversy ==
The most controversial aspect of Jungk's book is its depiction of the German nuclear program during World War II, despite it occupying a relatively small amount of the total book. Jungk's account is largely sympathetic to the German scientists, giving credence to the idea that the Germans failed to develop an atomic bomb because of moral objections from participants in the project, whose "resistance to Hitler" caused them to internally sabotage the project. This "passive resistance" by the Germans was contrasted against the vigorous participation of American scientists in the Manhattan Project, particularly J. Robert Oppenheimer and other top-level scientists, who "only did their duty" and as such participated in "an act of collective abandonment of conscience, horrifying in its magnitude."

This perpetuated what is known as the Lesart ("version"), a version of the events concocted by the German atomic scientists while captured and under observation by Allied forces at Farm Hall in 1945. The Lesart essentially reframes the German "failure" as a moral "success", and does so in a way that deliberately implies that the scientists who collaborated with the Nazis were in fact more "moral" than their Allied counterparts. Carl Friedrich von Weizsäcker and Werner Heisenberg in particular worked to disseminate versions of this story in the postwar, and Jungk's book is considered one of the main vectors by which their version of events was circulated. Most historians do not believe that the Lesart account is accurate, and have offered up many other reasons for the German nuclear program's lack of success in producing weapons.

In the German edition it is more clear than in the English edition that Jungk is depicting the American and British scientists as "victims" of a larger political system than as "evildoers". However both interpretations proved extremely controversial among non-German readers.

Heisenberg himself was uncomfortable with Jungk's description of his "active resistance" to Hitler. In 1957, he wrote a long letter to Jungk, prefacing it with the idea that while he had written a "fine and interesting book", nonetheless, he had several suggestions as to corrections that could be made in future editions. In particular, he wrote Jungk that:

You speak here towards the end of the second paragraph about active resistance to Hitler, and I believe—pardon my frankness—that this passage is determined by a total misunderstanding of a totalitarian dictatorship. In a dictatorship active resistance can only be practiced by people who seemingly take part in the system. ... I would not want this remark to be misunderstood as saying that I myself engaged in resistance to Hitler. On the contrary, I have always been ashamed in the face of the men of 20 July (some of whom were friends of mine), who at that time accomplished truly serious resistance at the cost of their lives. But even their example shows that real resistance can only come from people who appear to be playing along.

When Jungk reprinted part of Heisenberg's response as a footnote to the English edition of the book, he omitted the sentence where Heisenberg says "I would not want this remark to be misunderstood as saying that I myself engaged in resistance to Hitler." Without it, the quote still further implies the Heisenberg was indeed "playing along" and as such participating in "real resistance".

Weizsäcker similarly wrote a critical letter of the book to Jungk after its publication ("I admit that I am actually not happy about your book"), complaining that it contained factual inaccuracies throughout it, and that overall its tone exaggerated and dramatized what was a far more complicated set of events.

Because Jungk's book made Heisenberg into a hero of resistance, and because Jungk cited Heisenberg as a source, it was widely assumed that Jungk was serving Heisenberg's aims and acting as a mouthpiece. As such, the book provoked an angry reaction from Heisenberg's former mentor, Niels Bohr, particularly because the book framed a 1941 meeting between Heisenberg and Bohr in occupied Copenhagen as an attempt by Heisenberg to communicate to Bohr that the Germans were not building atomic weapons. In a series of letters that he never sent, Bohr strongly contested Jungk's version of this (believing it to be Heisenberg's), stating that it was clear to Bohr that at the time, Heisenberg "the firm impression that, under your leadership, everything was being done in Germany to develop atomic weapons."

Later in life Robert Jungk no longer stood behind some portions of his book. In a foreword published in a 1990 book on Germany's wartime atomic research he appeared to accuse Carl Friedrich von Weizsäcker and Werner Heisenberg, both of whom he consulted during the writing, of misleading him about the intentions of German physicists during World War II.

In The New World, 1939–1946, a history commissioned by the U.S. Atomic Energy Commission and published in 1962, historians Richard G. Hewlett and Oscar E. Anderson describe the book as "hopelessly inaccurate".

In a 1967 interview, the military head of the Manhattan Project, General Leslie Groves, said:

I wouldn't place any reliance on anything in that book Brighter than the Suns. For example, he gave quotes attributed to me that were the direct opposite of what I had given him. He did that with everybody he talked to. I'd say that he was thoroughly discredited in the eyes of everybody who knew him.

== See also ==
- Alexander Sachs
