= Crispin Whittell =

British director and playwright (born 1969)

Crispin Whittell (born 19 December 1969 in Nairobi, Kenya) is a British director and playwright.

He spent much of his early life in Africa. He was a member of the National Youth Theatre of Great Britain, and studied English at Cambridge University.

== Career ==
After leaving university Whittell was writer-in-residence at Nottingham Playhouse (1997).

He is perhaps best known for his play Darwin in Malibu which premiered at Birmingham Repertory Theatre in 2003 in a production directed by John Dove. It was shortlisted for the TMA Award for Best New Play. It was subsequently produced at Hampstead Theatre in London.

He is the writer of Happy Birthday, a film directed by Helen Mirren for Showtime. It starred Helen Mirren, John Goodman, David Hyde Pierce and Christopher Lloyd.

His play Happy Valley premiered at the Liverpool Everyman Theatre in 1997 in a production directed by Whittell.

Clever Dick, a farce about the American physicist Richard Feynman and The Manhattan Project, was produced at Hampstead Theatre in 2006 in a production directed by Whittell.

Whittell was then commissioned by Roger Rees to write Villa America about the American socialite couple Gerald and Sara Murphy, and their relationship with Pablo Picasso, F. Scott Fitzgerald and Ernest Hemingway. Villa America premiered at Williamstown Theatre Festival in 2007 in a production directed by Whittell.

Whittell is also the translator of Argentinian playwright-director Rafael Spregelburd’s play Stupidity (La Estupidez). Stupidity was developed at the National Theatre Studio as part of their Channels project. Richard Wolfe directed the English-language premiere for Theatre Conspiracy, in Vancouver, in 2007.

Other produced plays include Killing Him (Pleasance Edinburgh), and Party Tricks (Nottingham Playhouse) directed by Martin Clunes.

Whittell wrote and directed a short film, Hot Dog starring Tim McInnerny and Stephen Mangan.

He has also directed for the BBC (Twisted Tales) and Channel 4 (Coming Up).

In 2010 Whittell was commissioned to write a new version of A Christmas Carol for the Guthrie Theater in Minneapolis. It opened in November 2010 in a production directed by Joe Dowling with Daniel Gerroll as Scrooge. The production has been remounted every year since.

The Primrose Path - Whittell's adaptation of Turgenev's novel Home of the Gentry - opened at the Guthrie Theater in May 2013 in a production directed by Roger Rees.

In April 2013 he directed the World Premiere of Adam Rapp's play The Purple Lights of Joppa Illinois at South Coast Repertory Theatre. ,

== Plays ==
=== Unpublished ===
- Killing Her (Old Red Lion)
- Killing Him (Pleasance, Edinburgh)
- Party Tricks (Nottingham Playhouse)
- Happy Valley (Liverpool Everyman)
- Villa America (Williamstown Theatre Festival)

=== Published ===
- Darwin in Malibu (Birmingham Repertory Theatre)
- Stupidity/La Estupidez (Theatre Conspiracy, Vancouver)
- Clever Dick (Hampstead Theatre)
