= The Artificial Silk Girl =

1932 novel by Irmgard Keun

- Author: Irmgard Keun
- Genres: Fiction, Historical Fiction
- Publication date: 1932
- Publication place: Germany
- ISBN: 1-892-74681-6

The Artificial Silk Girl (German: Das kunstseidene Mädchen) is a novel by Irmgard Keun, published in Berlin in 1932. The protagonist Doris writes about how she struggles to survive, first in her hometown and then in pre-war Berlin.

The Artificial Silk Girl was a huge bestseller in Weimar Germany, until the Nazis banned it in 1933 and destroyed all existing copies. It is Keun's best known book in contemporary Germany.

It is referenced in Ali Smith's 2020 novel Summer.

== Story line ==
The novel takes place at the end of the Weimar Republic—from the end of the summer of 1931 to the spring of 1932—first in a medium-sized town in the Rhineland and then in Berlin. It tells the story of the eighteen-year-old protagonist Doris in the form of an ongoing, undated diary.

Doris would like to write her diary like a screenplay of the silent films of the time. Coming from modest circumstances with an alcoholic, absent father, she dreams of a life as a celebrity in high society. In order to be able to afford this lifestyle, she starts going out and sleeps with older, wealthier men. She loses her unloved job as a shorthand typist because she rejects sexual advances from her boss. Through the mediation of her mother, who works as a cloakroom attendant at a theater, she becomes an extra for a play. In order to gain recognition from the drama students, she lies that she had an affair with the theater director, but this lie soon threatens to be exposed as it spreads. Facing possible retribution if the lie is exposed, she steals an expensive fur coat from the theatre's wardrobe. Now fearing the police, she then flees to Berlin.

In Berlin, she gets back on her feet financially through various male acquaintances, but also loses her property and her accommodation again and again. She makes friends with a blind neighbor, but he is soon put into a home by his wife. She also becomes acquainted with the industrial magnate Alexander, with whom she lives in pure luxury. However, sometime later, Alexander is arrested for tax evasion.

Finally, when she is completely penniless, she meets a man Ernst, who takes her home and lets her live with him without expecting anything in return. He has been abandoned by his wife, whom he still mourns. Little by little, Doris begins to run the household and eventually a relationship develops between the two. When Doris realizes that Ernst cannot forget his ex-wife, she tracks her down and arranges for her return. It is clear to her that the ex-wife is only returning to Ernst for material reasons. Still, Doris thinks he'll be happier this way than with her. At the end of the novel, she is once again penniless and homeless and finally decides to move in with the peddler Karl, who lives in a gazebo.

== Contemporary reception of The Artificial Silk Girl ==
At least in Weimar Berlin, Keun met with much literary success, as an April 1933 article in the Leipzig weekly Das Leben attested. In one monthly, Der Querschnitt, a July 1932 publisher's advertisement for the book quotes Kurt Tucholsky as saying that Keun was the first female German humorist (‘was es noch niemals gegeben hat: eine deutsche Humoristin’), whilst Hanns Martin Elster asserted that she should be read and understood everywhere 'as a woman and a human being' ("Irmgard Keun sollte nicht nur als Dichterin, sollte auch als Frau und Mensch überall gelesen, überall verstanden werden"). A November 1932 review in the monthly Sherl’s Magazin describes Keun’s novel as ‘a book for the young’ ("das Buch aller jungen Menschen") and engages with the issue of modern materialism, saying ‘not everything that shines is gold’ ("nicht alles Gold ist, was glänzt").

== Translations ==
The novel was translated into Danish, English, French, Russian, Hungarian in 1933, Polish in 1934 and Spanish in 1965. Translations are also available in nine other languages. In October 2013 the first Hebrew translation was published.
