= Darwin in Malibu =

Darwin in Malibu is a play by British playwright and director, Crispin Whittell.

Darwin in Malibu imagines a meeting between Charles Darwin (‘the Devil’s Chaplain’), Thomas Huxley (‘the Devil’s Disciple’) and the Bishop of Oxford, Samuel Wilberforce on the deck of a beach house overlooking the Pacific over a hundred years after their deaths.

It premiered at Birmingham Repertory Theatre in 2003 in a production directed by John Dove. It was nominated for Best New Play at the TMA Awards.

It was subsequently produced at Hampstead Theatre in London, starring Oliver Ford Davies (as Darwin), Douglas Henshall (as Huxley), and Nigel Planer (as Wilberforce).

It premiered in the United States at the Bay Street Theatre in Sag Harbor, NY, starring Hal Linden (as Darwin), Richard Easton (as Wilberforce), Neal Huff (as Huxley), and Anna Chlumsky (as Sarah). The production was directed by Daniel Gerroll.

== Publication ==
It is published by Methuen in the United Kingdom, and by Dramatists Play Service in the United States.
