= WAA conflict between Bavaria and Austria =

Conflict in the 1980s

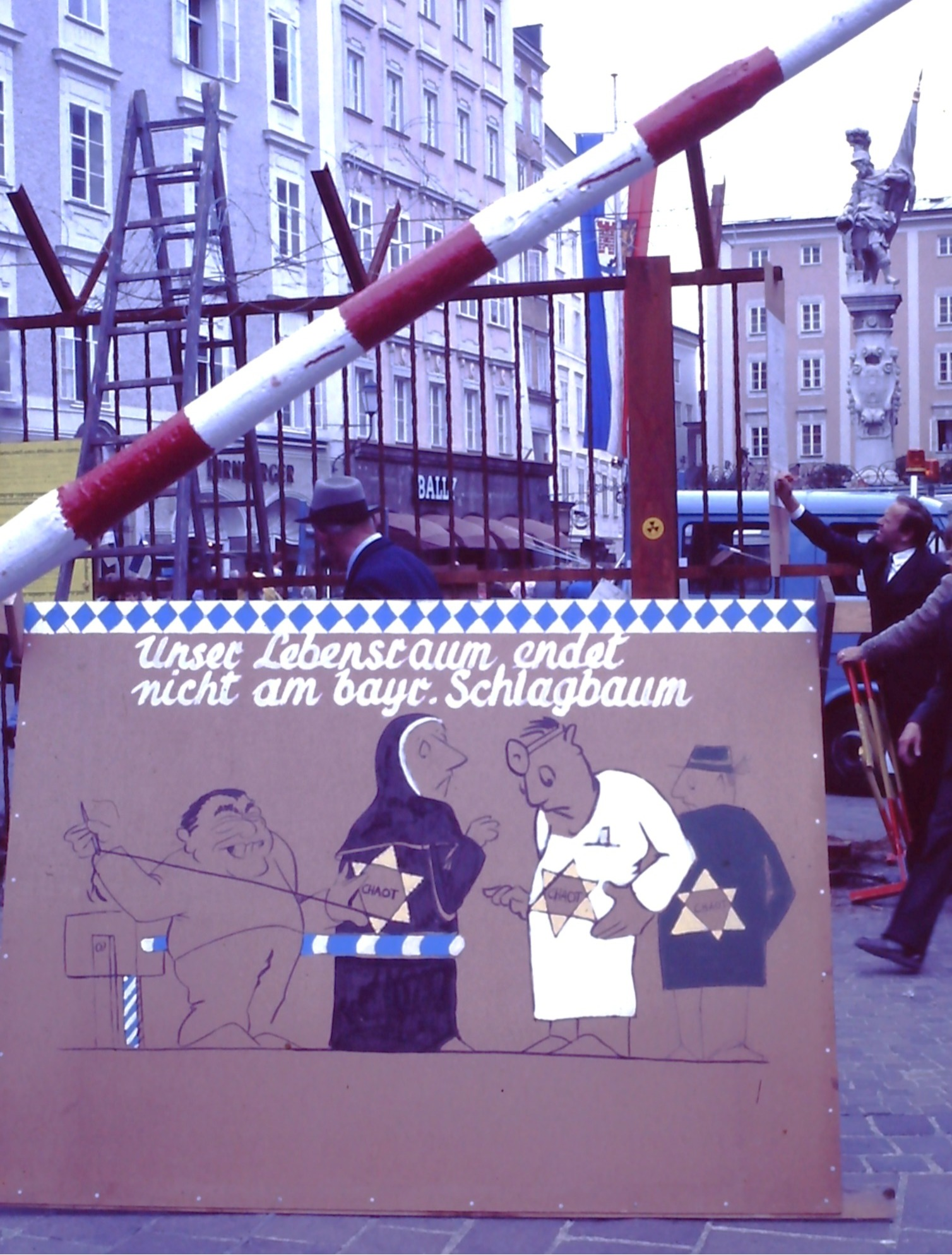
Bavarian border closure for Austrian "troublemakers" (protest in Salzburg 1986)

The WAA conflict between Bavaria and Austria (also called the Alps Feud or Alps War in the media) was a conflict between Bavaria and Austria that originated in 1986 when Bavaria imposed entry bans on Austrians who wanted to demonstrate against the Wackersdorf reprocessing plant (WAA) in the Bavarian district of Schwandorf. The Sunday Times asked with concern whether Bavaria was at war ("Bavaria at war").

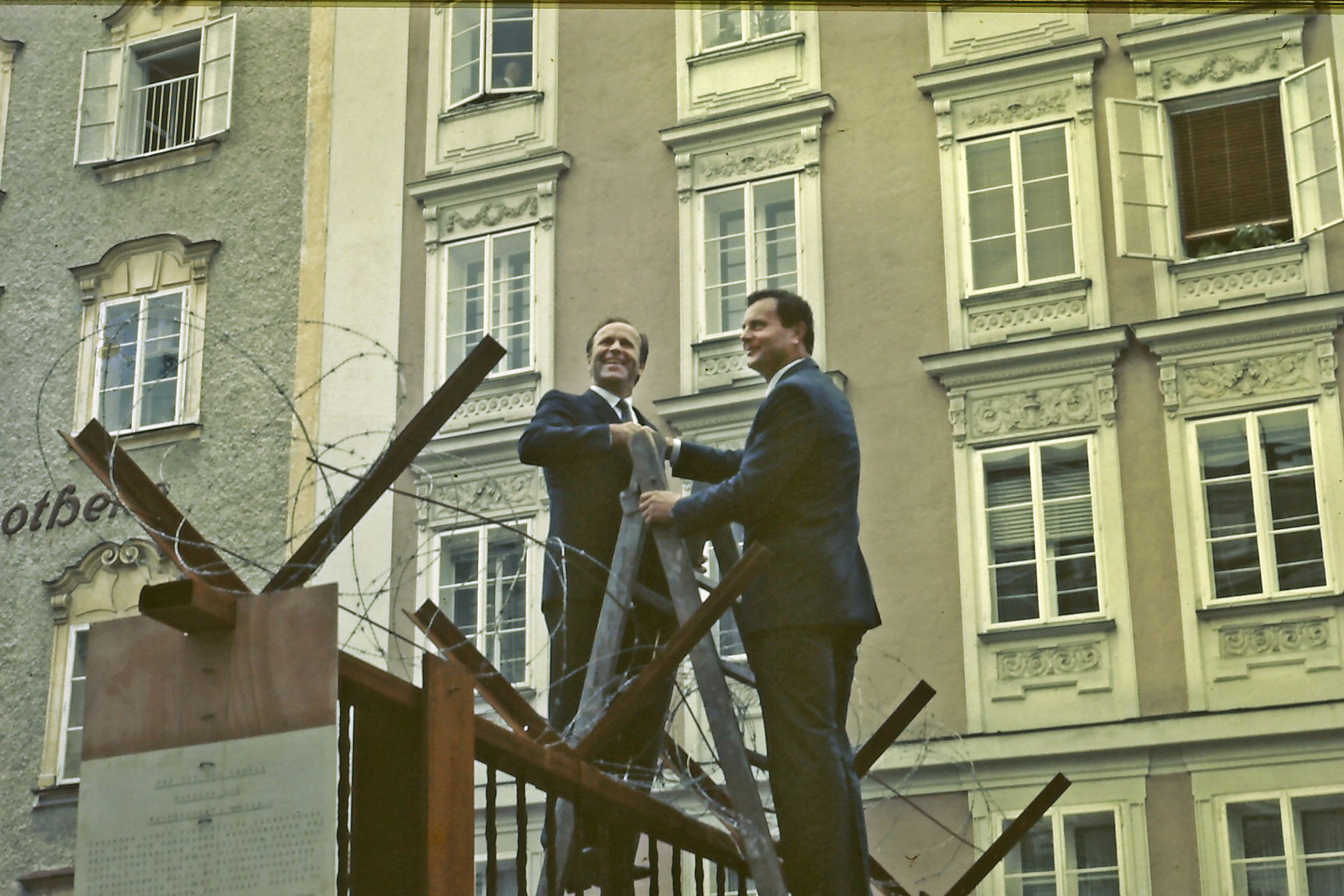
Anti-nuclear partnership: Hans Schuierer and Josef Reschen in Salzburg 1986

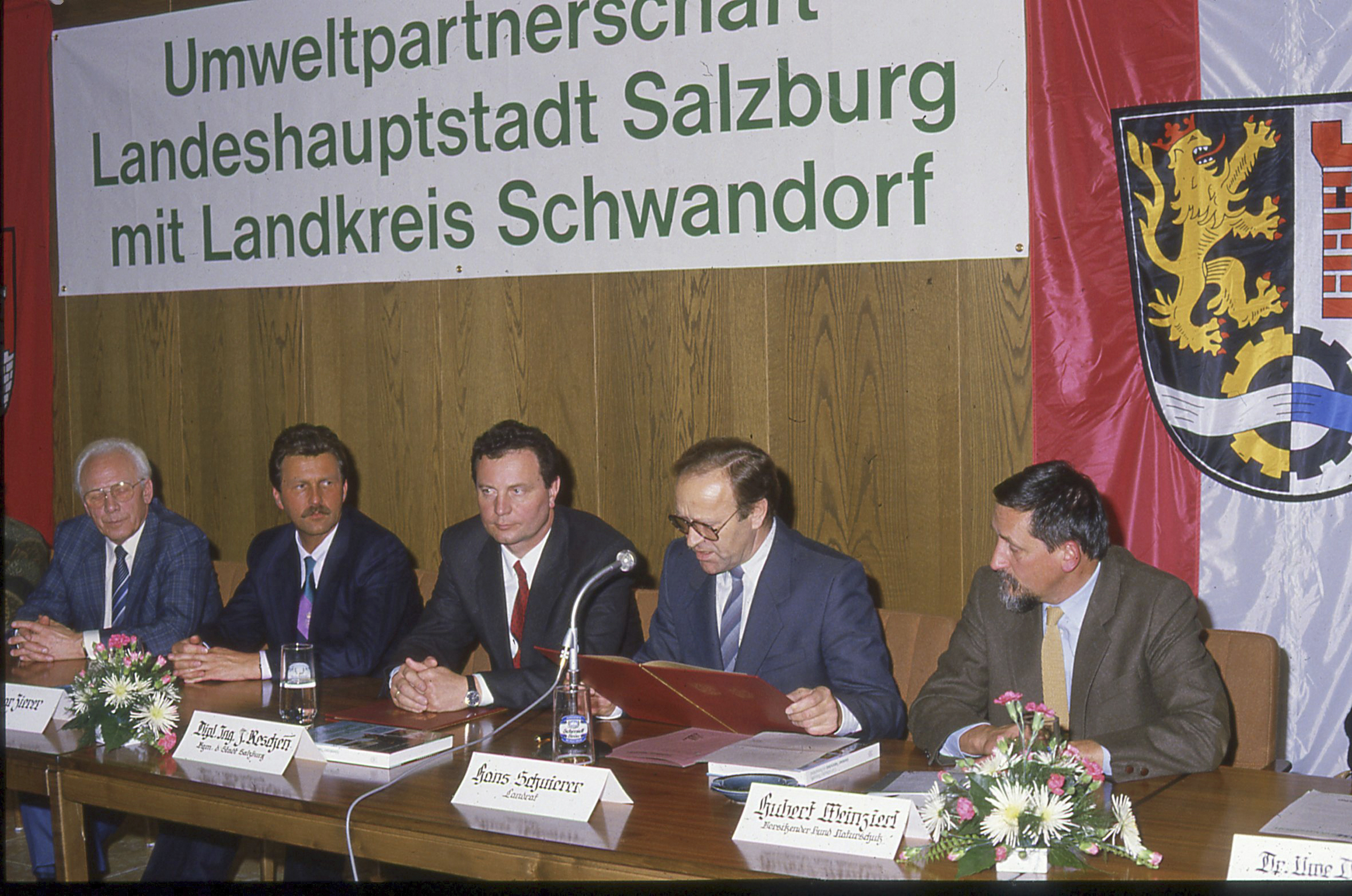
Environmental partnership Salzburg - Schwandorf: Dietmar Zierer, Josef Reschen, Hans Schuierer, Hubert Weinzierl 1987

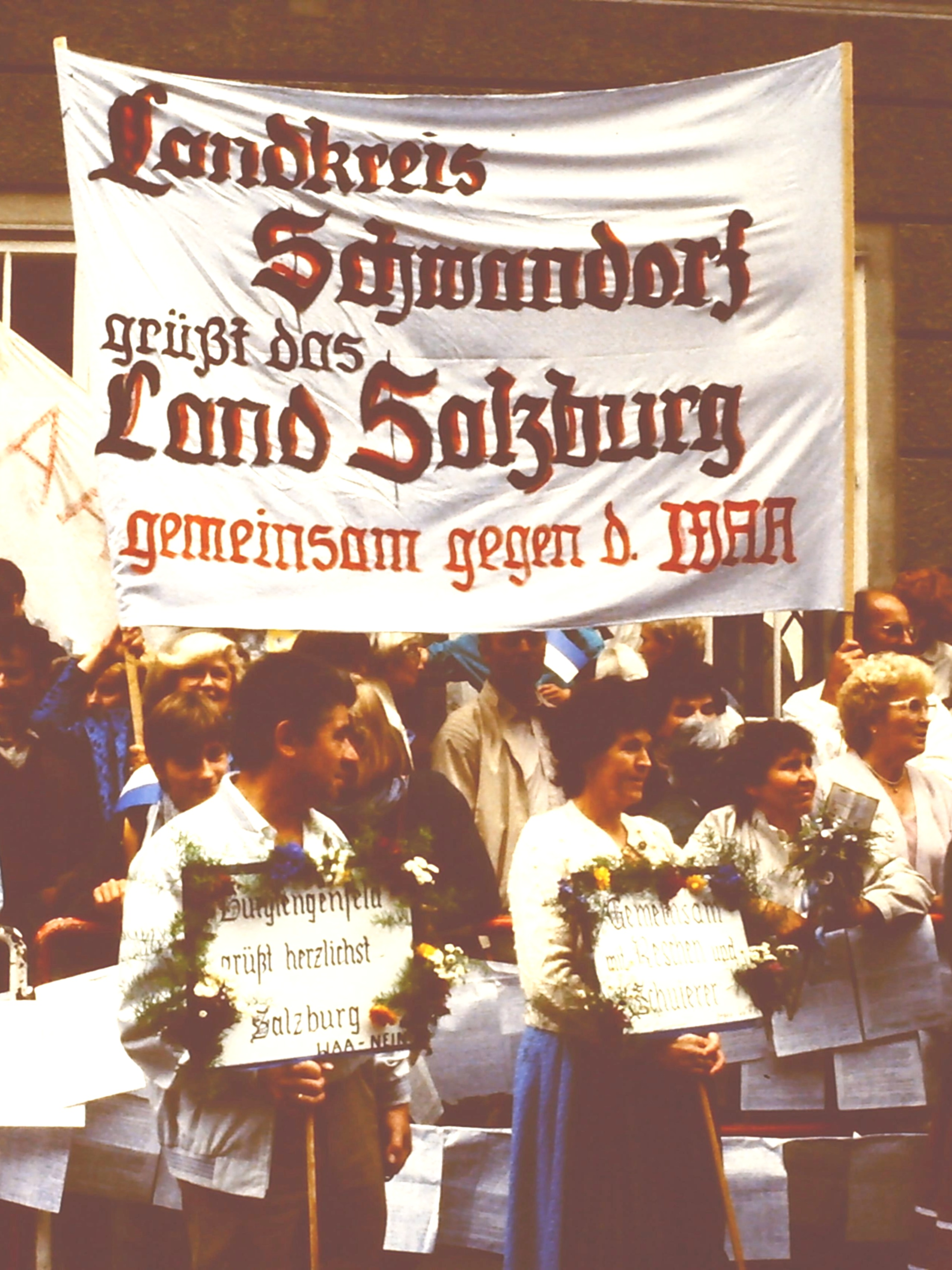
Bavarian WAA opponents at the Salzburg Festival 1986

== WAA protest from Austria ==
On July 27, 1986, the city of Salzburg and the Bavarian district of Schwandorf entered into an "Anti-nuclear partnership" (Anti-Atom-Partnerschaft) in the fight against the Wackersdorf reprocessing plant (WAA). At the opening of the Salzburg Festival season, Mayor Josef Reschen and District Administrator Hans Schuierer climbed a ladder in the Old Market Square and sealed the partnership with a handshake over a WAA construction fence element created by Salzburg activist Richard Hörl. The Upper Palatinate government dissolved this partnership, whereupon Schuierer and Reschen entered into an environmental partnership in 1987. On June 1, 1986, the WAA demonstrations became cross-border, with 3,000 Austrians receiving a euphoric welcome at the train station in Schwandorf. On September 6, 1988, Austrian WAA opponents organized the "Salzburg Protest Games" in Regensburg.

The vehement Salzburg resistance to the Wackersdorf reprocessing plant, largely organized by the citizens' initiative Platform against the Wackersdorf Reprocessing Plant (PLAGE), strained relations between the state of Salzburg and Bavaria. This also strained the relationship between Franz Josef Strauss and the then Governor of Salzburg, Wilfried Haslauer senior. In Salzburg in 1986, there was a debate about whether Strauss should be stripped of the 1985 award of the Grand Cross of the Decoration of Honour of the State of Salzburg. Salzburg resident Rupert Reiter wanted to award Strauss his Atom-Saunigl Order instead. After Strauss refused entry to a 32-bus Salzburg protest convoy heading towards the Wackersdorf plant in 1986, he was excluded from the Salzburg Festival and Hans Schuierer was invited instead. Thus, Schuierer sat in Strauss's seat at the festival premiere, next to Federal President Kurt Waldheim and Governor Haslauer.

== Entry bans for Austrians ==
On June 30, 1986, the Bavarian Interior Minister Karl Hillermeier ordered the borders closed. Of 2,000 foreign visitors who wanted to demonstrate against the WAA (nuclear reprocessing plant) in Regensburg, only four (including Hildegard Breiner) arrived. Some of the Austrians who were denied entry received the passport stamp "Refused".

Schwandorf's District Administrator Schuierer commented: "This measure is tantamount to moving the construction fence to the German-Austrian border." Christa Meier accused the CSU of violating international law. The Bavarian State Secretary of the Interior, Heinz Rosenbauer, declared on behalf of his boss, Hillermeier, that such a demonstration by "foreign" protesters would "disrupt the political decision-making process in the Federal Republic" and that "interference in Bavarian energy policy" would not be tolerated. Hubert Weinzierl of the BUND (Friends of the Earth Germany) opined that Interior Minister Hillermeier was making himself the "gravedigger of Bavarian liberalism" by imposing the entry ban. Willi Rothley was surprised that the Austrians were being turned away at Bavaria's border "as if by an Eastern Bloc country" and that the Bonn Interior Ministry under Friedrich Zimmermann (CSU) saw no reason to lift the Bavarian measures. Zimmermann also reminded Austria that "the economies of both nations are closely intertwined and that most of Austria's tourists come from Germany," which was interpreted in Austria as veiled blackmail.

On June 7, 1986, seven buses carrying approximately 400 potential anti-nuclear power plant demonstrators were denied entry into Bavaria via Kufstein, whereupon the demonstrators blocked the motorway to Austria with sit-ins.

The Austrian Broadcasting Corporation (ORF) referred to these actions as "Eastern Bloc methods," and anti-nuclear activists announced a blockade of the roads for German tourists. In retrospect, the taz newspaper wrote that the "radioactive erosion of civil liberties" had escalated with house searches, police "beatings," demonstration bans, and entry bans for Austrian anti-nuclear activists.

== Development of the conflict ==
Bavaria considered measures against Austria in air traffic. State Minister Edmund Stoiber, for example, wanted to close the airspace to Austrian military aircraft. In July 1986, Austria's Vice Chancellor Norbert Steger wanted to travel to the Anti-WAAhnsinns Festival in Burglengenfeld. The Bavarian state government planned to impose an entry ban on him, which was subsequently withdrawn by Foreign Minister Hans-Dietrich Genscher; Steger still did not go. In 1986, after the Chernobyl reactor accident, the Austrian Federal Government under Fred Sinowatz decided to negotiate with Bonn about abandoning the WAA project, because an accident would "threaten all of Austria." The Austrian activists were experienced in the successful fight against the Zwentendorf Nuclear Power Plant and argued that radioactivity "does not stop at national borders." The protests from Austria were “rejected” by the German Federal Government under Helmut Kohl. At a special session of the Federal Committee on Internal Affairs, Alfred Sauter (CSU) declared that the "decisive, successful, and proportionate measures" had prevented a further escalation in Wackersdorf, whereas the SPÖ and SPD protested against the border closures, arguing that this constituted a serious infringement on European freedom of movement, severely strained relations with Austria, and criminalized WAA demonstrators. In 1986, Erich Kiesl and Kurt Biedenkopf attempted to defuse the Bavarian-Austrian WAA controversy in a confidential meeting with Wilfried Haslauer, the governor of Salzburg and a WAA opponent, and sought "a kind of redress for the rhetoric from Munich."

The conflict escalated further with the rejection of ORF journalist Elfriede Geiblinger in January 1987. Austria's Interior Minister Karl Blecha spoke of an "unheard-of procedure, not customary between pluralistic states," and the Austrian Foreign Ministry even saw a violation of "the spirit and letter of the provisions of the Helsinki Final Act" and tasked the embassy in Bonn with clarifying the matter.

In July 1986, Kurt Waldheim asked the Bavarian Minister-President Franz Josef Strauss to "reconsider" the Wackersdorf issue in light of the anti-nuclear sentiment in Austria, a request Strauss sharply rejected in a letter. According to Strauss, violent demonstrators wanted to destroy the democratic rule of law, and it was also in Austria's interest to repel this attack. He considered Austria's protests to be "interference in Bavaria's internal affairs." In February 1987, over 1,000 WAA opponents protested against Strauss's attendance at the Vienna Opera Ball. Anti-nuclear activists threw leaflets into the ballroom and unfurled a banner during the opening ceremony; outside, a street battle ensued with the police, a German flag was burned, and Molotov cocktails were thrown. The Minister of the Interior, Karl Blecha, was sharply criticized by The Greens for the harsh police action during the first protests surrounding the Vienna Opera Ball.

In April 1987, Bavaria's Interior Minister August Lang and the State Secretary for the Environment Alois Glück wanted to discuss "The Bavarian-Austrian Finger-Wrestling Match" in a live BR broadcast in Salzburg, but this was forbidden by Strauss. Strauss stated that he could not allow "Bavarian cabinet members to be heckled abroad and then possibly be unable to handle the discussion."

A social science study on the WAA in 1987 accused the operators of hypocrisy and complained of systematic obstruction of opposition movements similar to the McCarthy era. A political science report in 1988 derived from international law a right for Austria to be consulted and to participate in the decision-making process regarding the WAA, deemed it inadmissible under international law, and recommended that Austria appeal to the International Court of Justice. On 22 July 1988, the Austrian Minister for the Environment, Marilies Flemming, announced that she would appeal to the Bavarian Administrative Court in Munich and the Federal Administrative Court on behalf of the Republic of Austria.

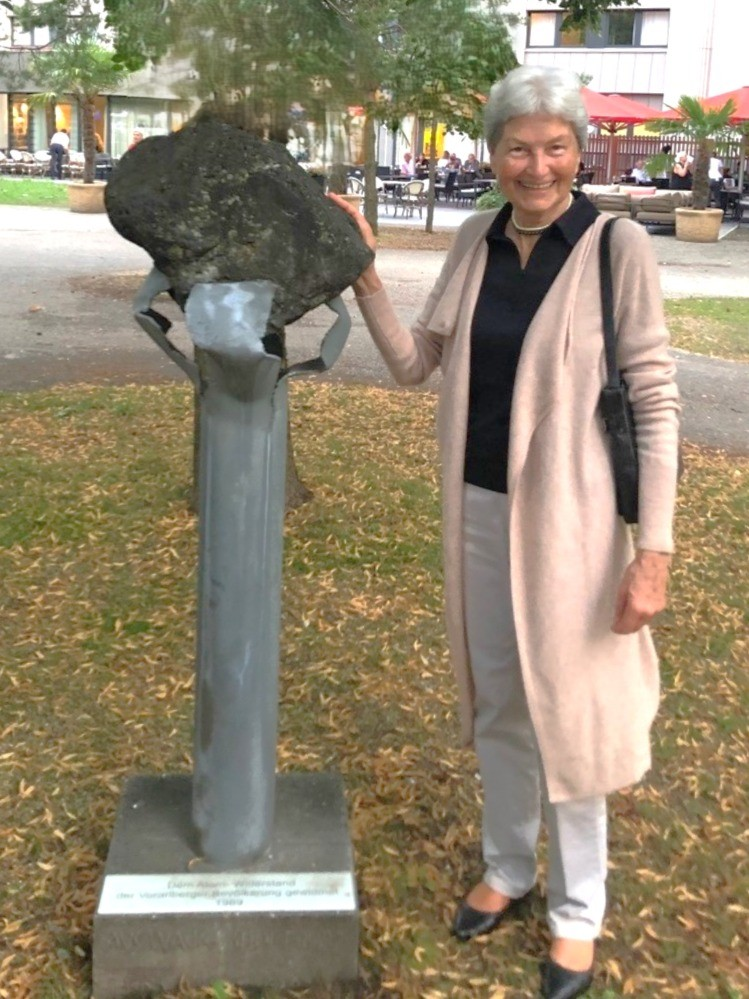
Hildegard Breiner at the WAA memorial stone in Bregenz, 2019

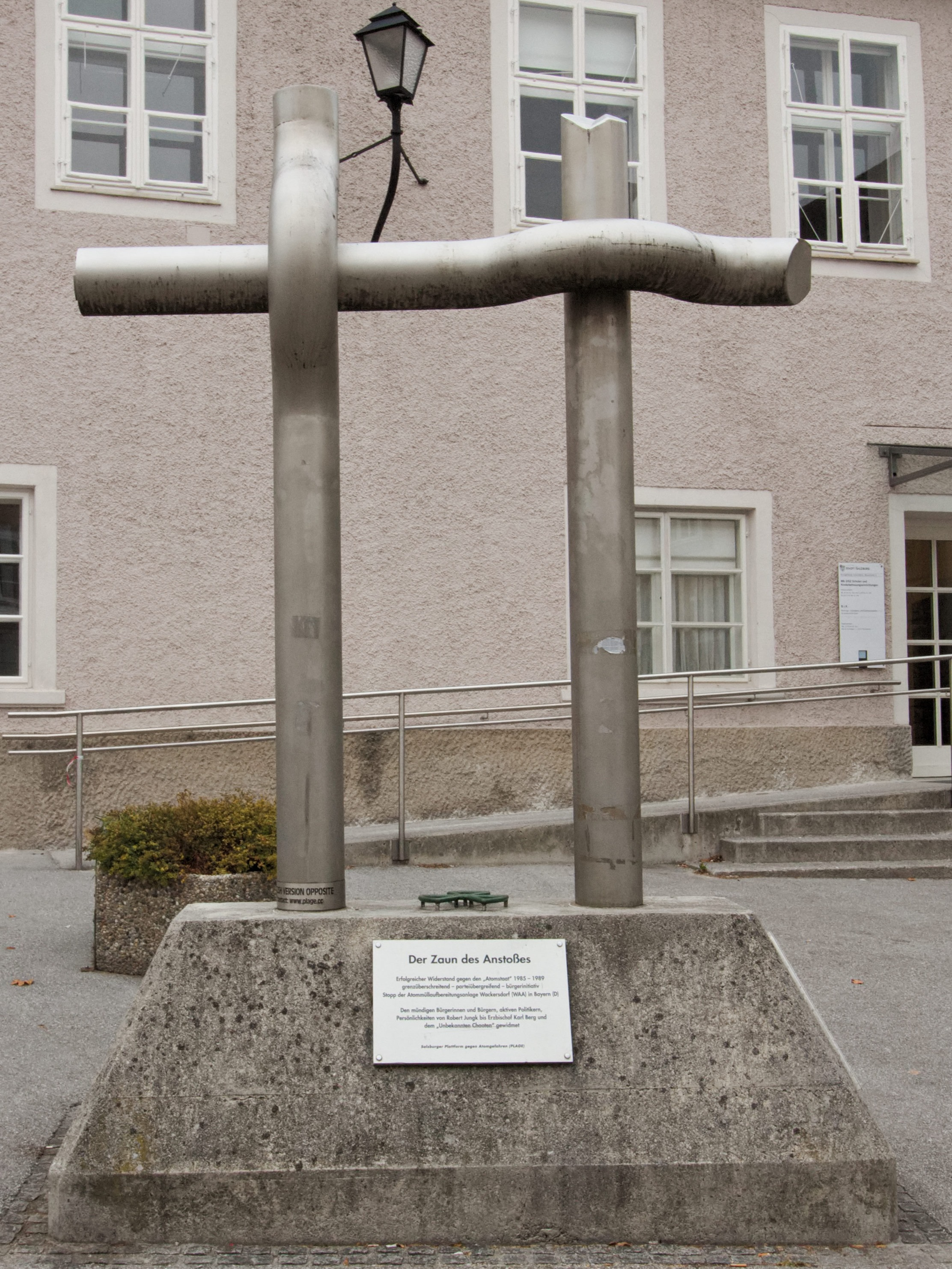
Wackersdorf Memorial (Salzburg)

Even today, the Wackersdorf memorial in Salzburg and the WAA memorial in Bregenz commemorate the resistance of the people in Austria against the Wackersdorf reprocessing plant (WAA).

== Radio reports and audio recordings ==
- Foreign Minister Leopold Gratz responds to sharp attacks by West German Interior Minister Friedrich Zimmermann and the connection to official Austrian anti-Wackersdorf concerns (May 1986)
- Wackersdorf Controversy: Leopold Gratz to Friedrich Zimmermann / Wackersdorf Controversy: Munich CSU against Strauss's nuclear policy / Wackersdorf Controversy: German Trade Union Confederation (DGB) against nuclear power (May 1986)
- Bavarian authorities close borders to Austria: Kufstein / Kiefersfelden – moderator discussion (June 1986)
- Entry ban for Austrian anti-Wackersdorf demonstration to Bavaria (including Interior Minister Blecha, Karl-Heinz Hiersemann, Foreign Minister Peter Jankowitsch) (June 1986)
- Science Minister Heinz Fischer on Wackersdorf (July 1986)
- Expert discussion: Dangerousness of Wackersdorf (July 1986)
- Upper Austrian Wackersdorf demonstrator remains in custody (July 1986) / Verdict in the Spöttl “Wackersdorf” trial (August 1986)
- Domestic press review / Foreign press review on Wackersdorf – discussion; Interview with Vice Chancellor Norbert Steger; Two Austrians arrested in West Germany (July 1986)
- Controversy between Austria and West Germany: Report from the anti-madness, Anti-WAAhnsinns Festival in Burglengenfeld / Bavarian State Secretary Heinz Rosenbauer / FPÖ General Secretary Walter Grabher-Meyer / Foreign Minister Peter Jankowitsch before his meeting with Hans-Dietrich Genscher in Salzburg (July 1986)
- Demonstrations at the borders against Wackersdorf – Reports from Salzburg, Upper Austria, Vorarlberg (July 1986)
- Vice Chancellor Steger on Wackersdorf / Strauss / Genscher; Jürgen Möllemann on Strauss's attacks against Genscher (August 1986)
- Council of Ministers: Wackersdorf disputes with a shot of Federal Chancellor Franz Vranitzky (August 1986)
- Austrian-Bavarian entry restrictions in '86 – BR talk show: Ringelstetter in conversation with Hans Schuierer (January 2021)

== Literature ==
- Jakob Felsberger: Widerstand aus Österreich (Resistance from Austria). in: Jakob Felsberger: Tschernobyl in Erlangen – Reaktionen und Dynamiken im lokalen Umfeld 1986–1989 (Chernobyl in Erlangen – Reactions and Dynamics in the Local Environment 1986–1989). University of Erlangen–Nuremberg, Erlangen 2020, ISBN 978-3-96147-285-7, pp. 65–68.
- Gerog Schöfbänker, Erfried Erker: Wackersdorf und Salzburg. Konturen einer Politik gegen eine Plutoniumfabrik. (Wackersdorf and Salzburg. Outlines of a Policy Against a Plutonium Factory). in: Herbert Dachs, Roland Floimair (eds.): Salzburg Yearbook for Politics 1989. Salzburg 1989, ISBN 978-3-7017-0611-2, pp. 99–120.
- Robert Kriechbaumer, Michael Mair: Wackersdorf - Die Apokalypse vor der Haustür? (Wackersdorf – The Apocalypse on Our Doorstep?) In: Ibid.: Der lange Umweg zur Macht. Die Geschichte der Grünen in Salzburg bis 2013 (The Long Detour to Power. The History of the Greens in Salzburg until 2013) (= Publications of the Research Institute for Political and Historical Studies of the Dr. Wilfried Haslauer Library. Vol. 61). Salzburg 2017, ISBN 978-3-205-20650-7, pp. 148–160.
- Sonja Margret Schinagl: Ein Überblick über das bisherige österreichische Engagement in Anti-Atomfragen. (An overview of Austria's previous involvement in anti-nuclear issues.) in Schinagl: Der österreichisch-tschechische Diskurs über die friedliche Nutzung der Kernenergie in der Tschechischen Republik. Diplomarbeit, University of Salzburg 2004, p.13–22.
