= Thomas Neff (environmentalist) =

Austrian environmentalist and activist

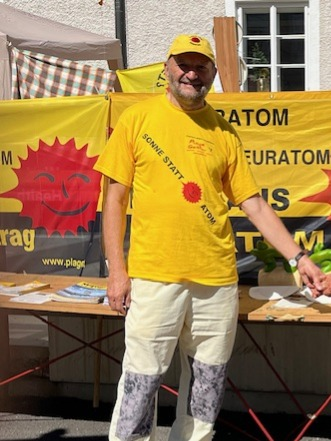
- Thomas Neff, 2025

Thomas Neff (born 1955 in Linz) is an Austrian environmentalist and activist in the Anti-nuclear movement in Austria. A resident of Schleedorf, he has been active for decades with the Platform Against Nuclear Dangers Salzburg (PLAGE) and is committed to environmental protection in many areas.

== Personal life ==
Thomas Neff began training as an electromechanic at the age of 15, actively championed workplace safety and environmental protection in his role as a youth representative, and worked in the trade as a skilled worker for ten years. Following his military and alternative civilian service, he trained as a therapeutic masseur and has been self-employed as a professional and therapeutic masseur since 1984. Neff's wife, Stefanie is also active in environmental causes and the movement against nuclear power.

== Wackersdorf Memorial (Salzburg) ==
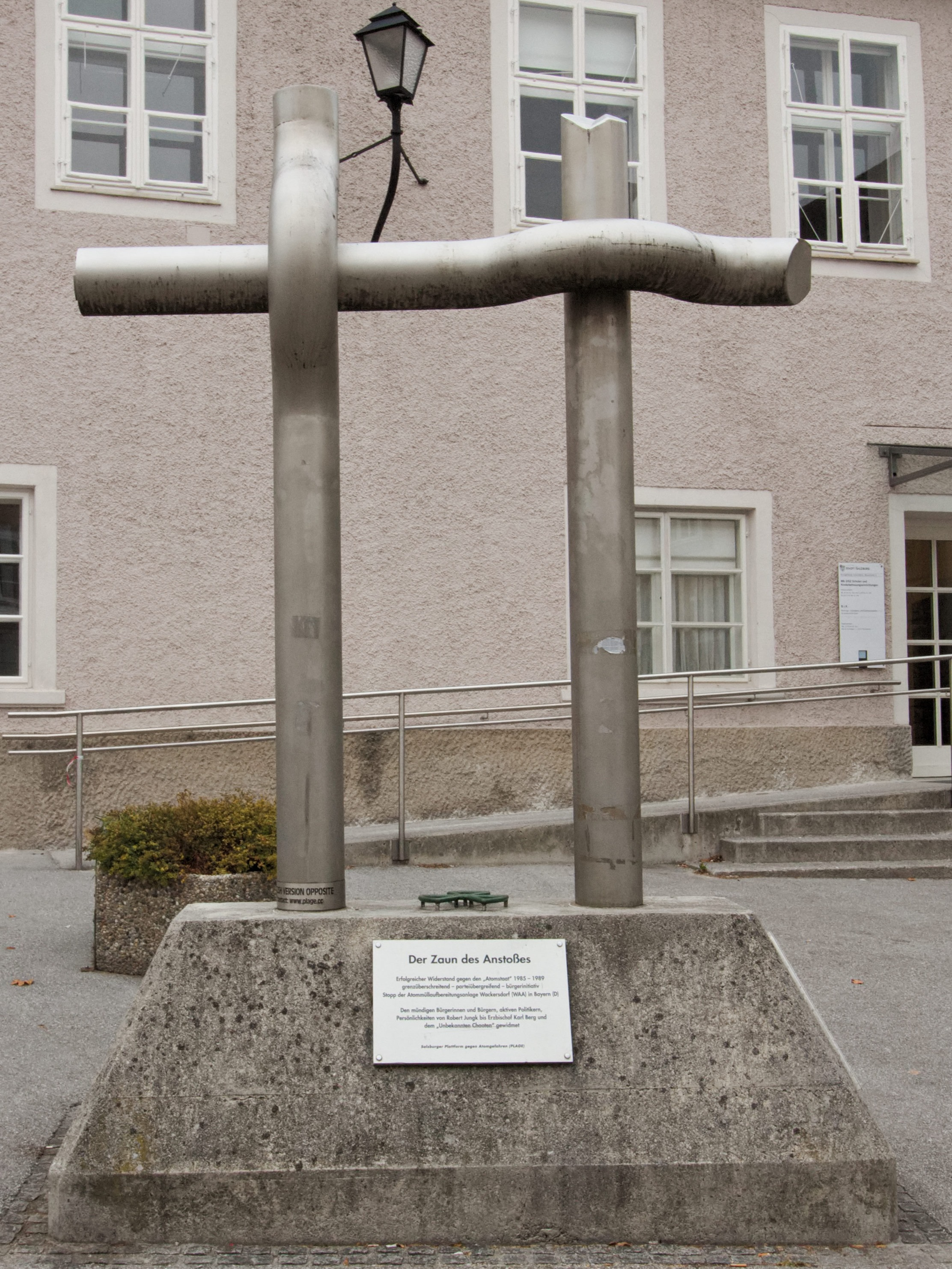
Wackersdorf Memorial at Mozartplatz

Neff is the initiator, planner, artist, and co-creator of the Wackersdorf Memorial (Salzburg). As early as the 1980s, Neff demonstrated against the construction of the Wackersdorf reprocessing plant (WAA) and was a regular activist on-site in Wackersdorf. In 1999, marking the tenth anniversary of the halt in WAA construction, he conceived the idea for a Wackersdorf memorial after receiving a paperweight (a souvenir made from original sections of the construction site fencing) from the Upper Palatinate. He quickly won over his fellow PLAGE activist Heinz Stockinger to the project. For the memorial's design, Neff scaled up the paperweight thirteen-fold and also designed the concrete base. The base of the original construction fence in Wackersdorf had been built with a very steep incline to prevent protesters from reaching the fence directly; Neff's memorial base replicated this same angle of inclination. The memorial was unveiled on July 20, 2000, at the opening of the Salzburg Festival and was consecrated by Vinzenz Baldemair (Provost of Mattsee Abbey). Attendees included key figures from the "official" anti-Wackersdorf resistance movement: Hans Schuierer (former District Administrator of Schwandorf), Josef Reschen (former Mayor of Salzburg), and Mayor Heinz Schaden.

== Environmental protection campaigns ==
Neff's activism is characterized by numerous attention-grabbing and sometimes spectacular campaigns focused on environmental protection and opposition to nuclear energy.

=== A clean Salzach river without chlorine bleaching ===
In 1987–88, Neff campaigned vigorously against the use of toxic chlorine bleaching by the Hallein paper mill and advocated for a clean Salzach River. This demand was met politically in 1991 with the introduction of oxygen bleaching, allowing the Salzach to be revitalized downstream from Hallein.

=== Radioactive clock faces ===
Between 1988 and 1998, Neff examined the clock faces of alarm clocks and pocket watches and found that they emitted radioactive radiation. Neff received the "City of Linz Environmental Protection Award" for his years of work addressing the issue of radioactive luminous paints and other nuclides on the dials of alarm clocks and pocket watches, as well as for conducting measurements in kindergartens and private households. Neff's research also led to extensive coverage in the Japanese media. After Chernobyl, the Japanese journalist Hirokawa Ryuichi visited Neff and photographed him using a Geiger counter to check heavily contaminated fish.

=== Radioactive speedometer dials in ÖBB locomotives ===
After discovering with his Geiger counter that alarm clock and watch dials emitted radiation, Neff also examined speedometer dials in Austrian Federal Railways (ÖBB) locomotives in 1997. He detected significantly higher levels of radiation. The dials were coated with a radium-based paste that made them glow in the dark. Neff gained unauthorized access to the ÖBB repair facility in Linz where speedometers were regularly dismantled and serviced and found that the workers' workbenches were also contaminated with radioactivity. ÖBB acknowledged the issue and, with Neff's assistance, removed the radioactive speedometer dials from 76 locomotives; the maintenance technicians' workstations also required extensive decontamination. In 1998, Neff was awarded the Environmental Protection Prize by the province of Upper Austria for this work.

=== Radioactivity measurements in the Czech Republic ===
In 2001, Neff conducted unofficial radioactivity measurements at the Mydlovary uranium sludge dump in the Czech Republic. Located ten kilometers from the Temelín Nuclear Power Station, 36 million tons of radioactive sludge (a legacy of a former uranium processing plant) are buried there. In 2002, he officially repeated the measurements with the legal assistance of the American lawyer Ed Fagan.

=== Radioactivity in schools ===
Neff, who has been using his Geiger counter to check for radiation in everyday environments since the Chernobyl nuclear disaster, accidentally discovered uranium-bearing rock (pitchblende) in the biology classroom of the Herz-Jesu-Gymnasium in Salzburg-Liefering in 2016. Following this discovery in the school's mineral collection, he inspected biology classrooms at several other schools in Austria and found more uranium-bearing rock. Subsequently, as part of a doctoral research project by PLAGE member Peter Machart and in cooperation with the State of Salzburg a radiological screening of geological collections in schools was conducted; radioactive minerals were found in thirteen additional schools, and the affected collections were subsequently remediated.

=== Quit Euratom actions ===
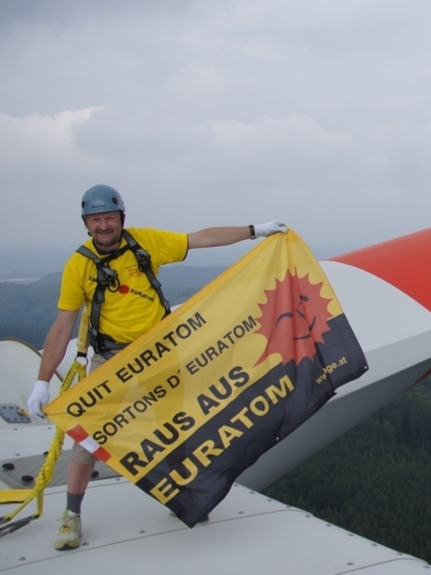
Thomas Neff vs. Euratom on a wind turbine in Munderfing (Austria)

Hunger strike and referendum against Euratom

In 2003, Neff began a 14-day hunger strike at Vienna's Ballhausplatz against the preferential treatment of the nuclear industry afforded by the Euratom Treaty. In 2011, he was primarily involved in the referendum "Out of Euratom." Neff was the driving force behind the referendum, which was held shortly before the Fukushima nuclear disaster.

Quit Euratom at the Vienna Opera Ball

In 2007, anti-nuclear activists Stefanie Neff and Thomas Neff from the Salzburg Platform Against Nuclear Dangers and activists Roland Egger, Gabriele Schweiger, Gudrun and Hans Peter Horky (Nuclear Stop Upper Austria) staged a high-profile demonstration against the EURATOM Treaty (“Out of EURATOM”) at the Vienna Opera Ball.

Actions on wind turbines

As early as 2014, Neff and other anti-nuclear activists from Flachgau made their voices heard against nuclear power and in favor of alternative energies with banners and a rappelling action from a 140-meter wind turbine in the Munderfing wind farm (Upper Austria). In 2017, under the leadership of Thomas Neff, a 120-square-meter banner was unfurled on the wind turbine in Munderfing. The aim was to send an unmistakable message in favor of using renewable energies and against nuclear power. Neff and his team demanded Austria's withdrawal from the Euratom Treaty, which, in their view, promoted the nuclear industry. At the same time, they also wanted to support the pioneers of wind energy.

Award-winning short video - "Quit Euratom"

In 2019, Neff conceived the idea for the film "Get Out of Euratom" (or "The Sick Nuclear Industry"). Neff developed the concept for the action video and organized the financing and execution of the film project. The short video exists in eight languages (German, English, French, Spanish, Czech, Russian, Chinese, Japanese) and in 2020 Neff received the European Solar Prize for it, awarded annually by the organization Eurosolar. The film was recognized in the "Media & Communication" category as an outstanding project for renewable energies.

Art project - Banner on the move

On their travels, Thomas and Stefanie Neff always carry their banner "Raus aus Euratom" (Quit Euratom) with them, thus documenting their demands for a nuclear-free world. In 2010, the PLAGE activist launched the art project "Banner on the Move".

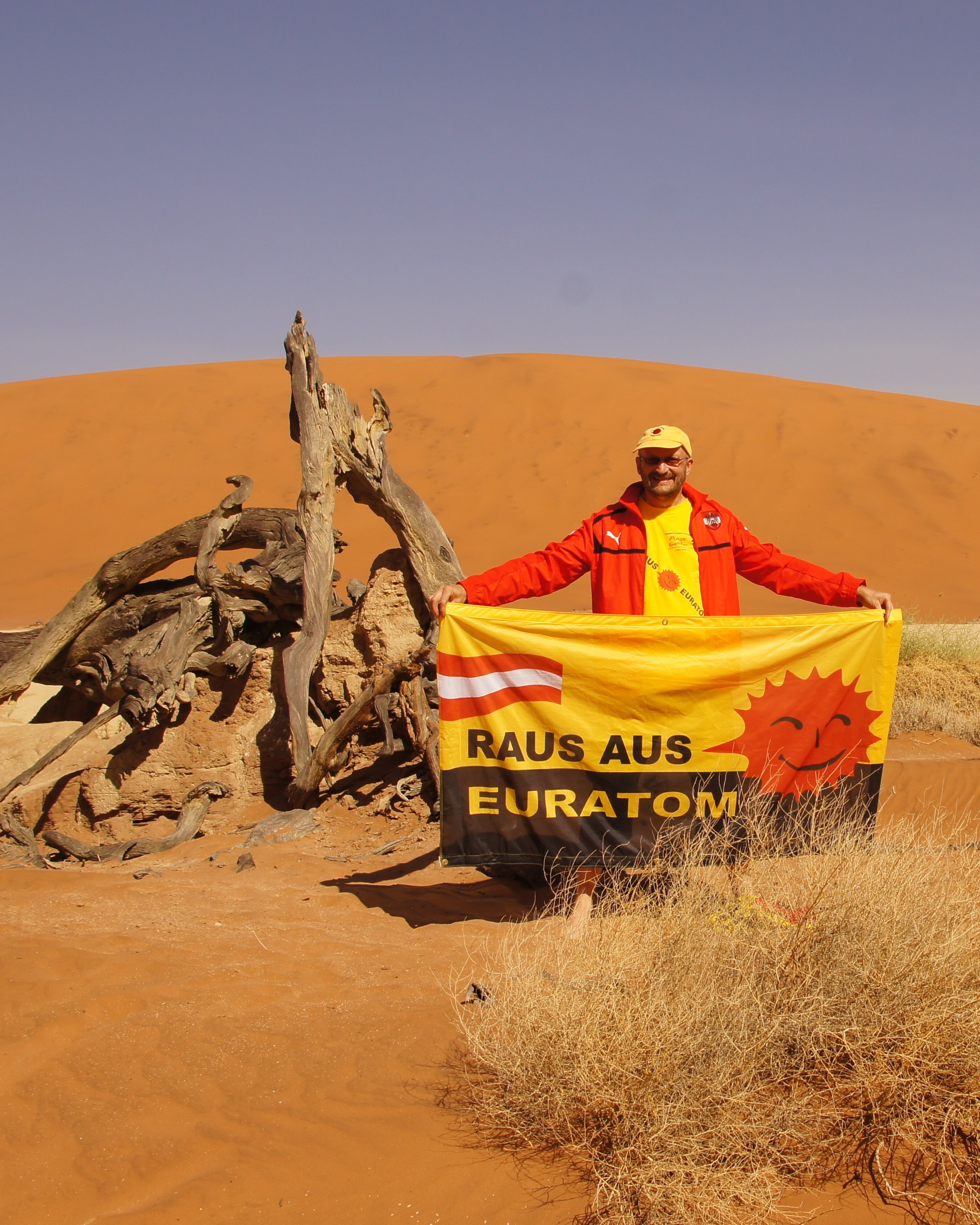
Sossusvlei in Namibia

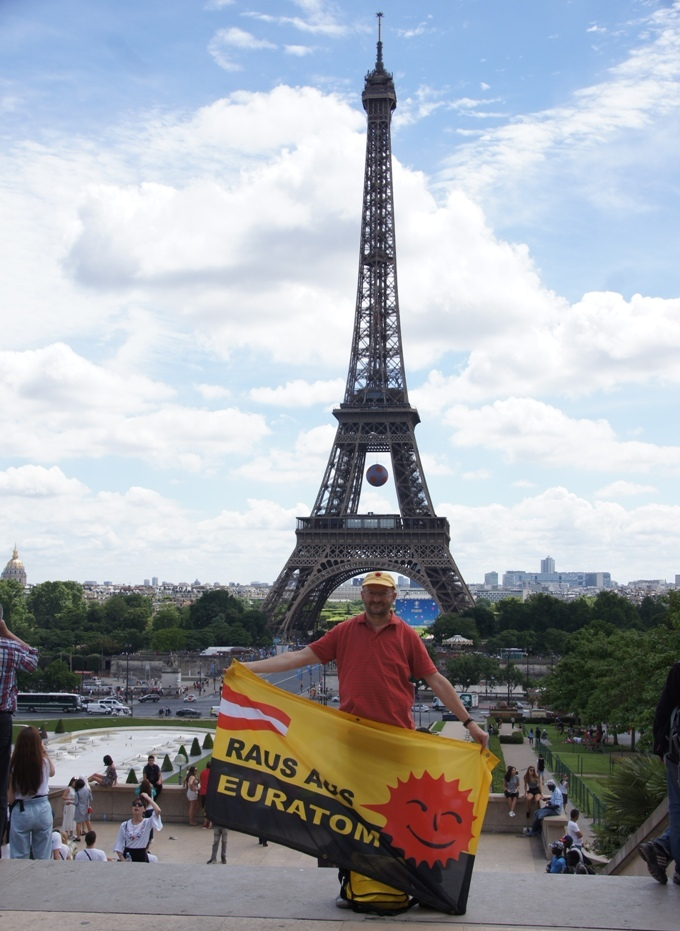
Eiffel Tower in Paris

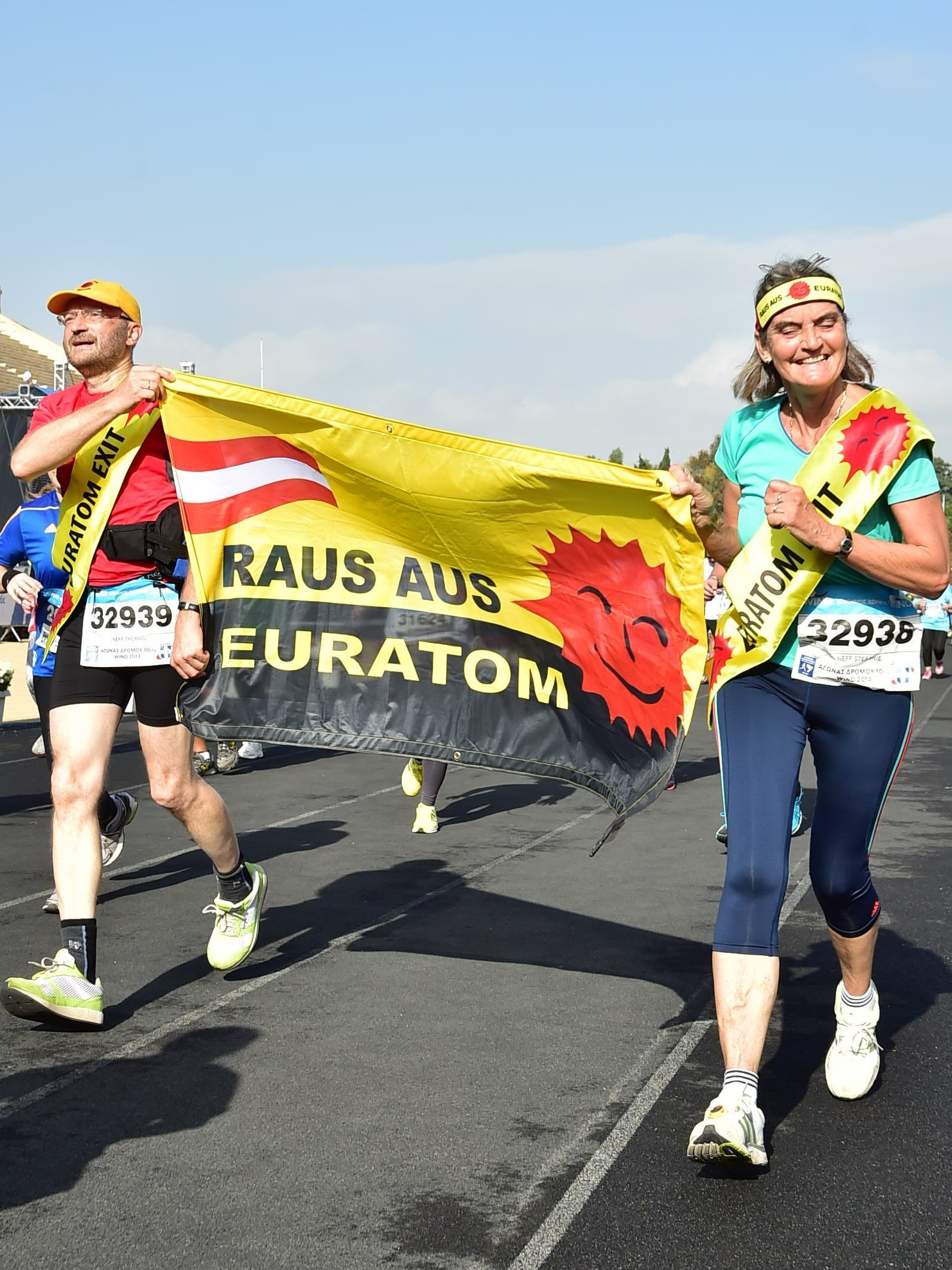
Athen-Marathon

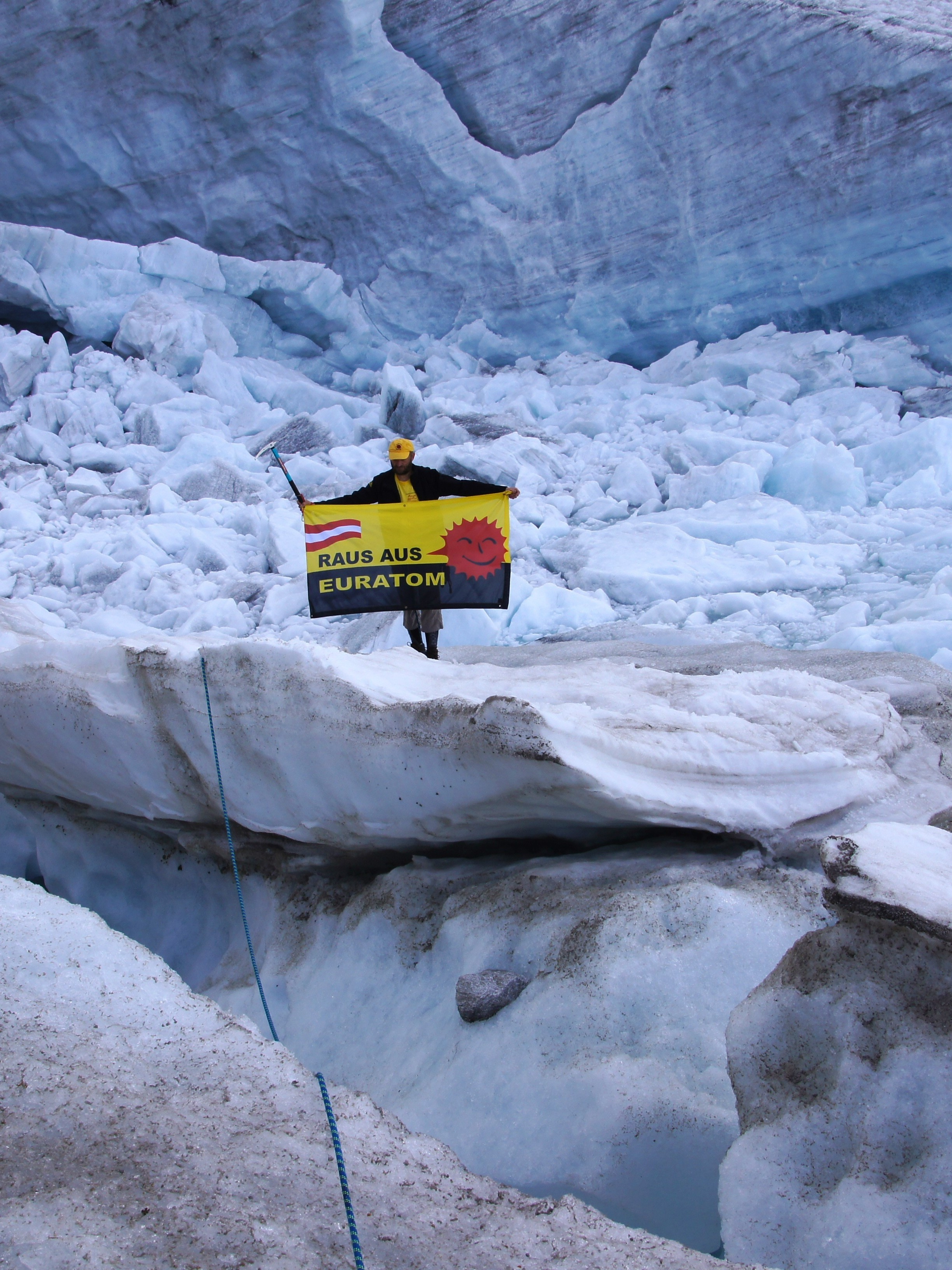
Weisssee- Glacier in Austria

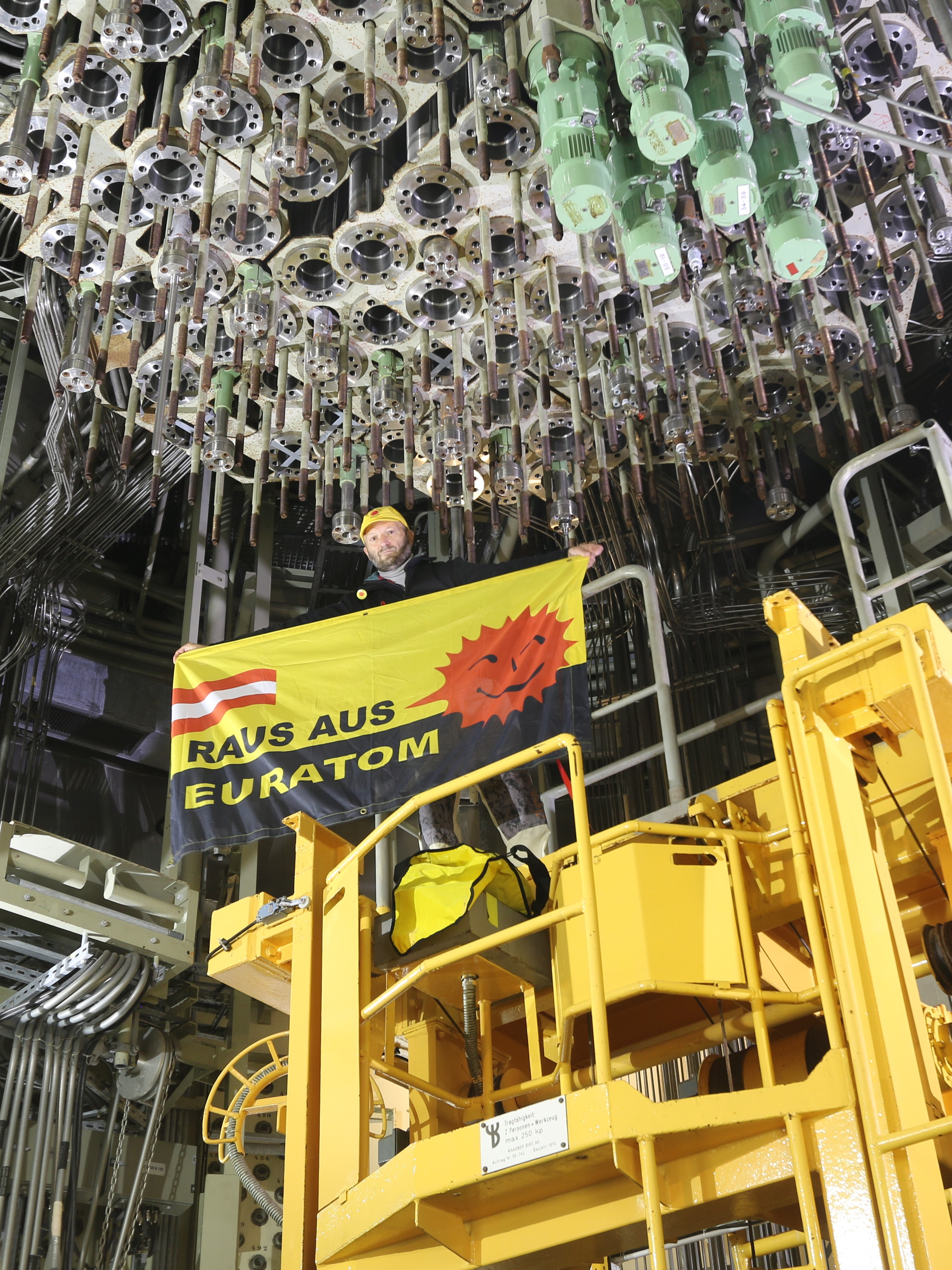
NPP Zwentendorf

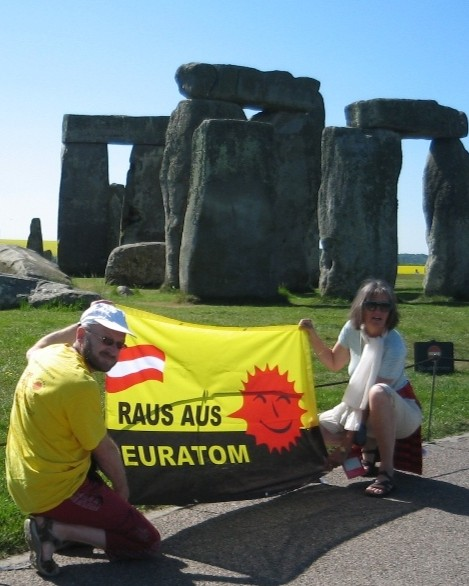
Stonehenge in England

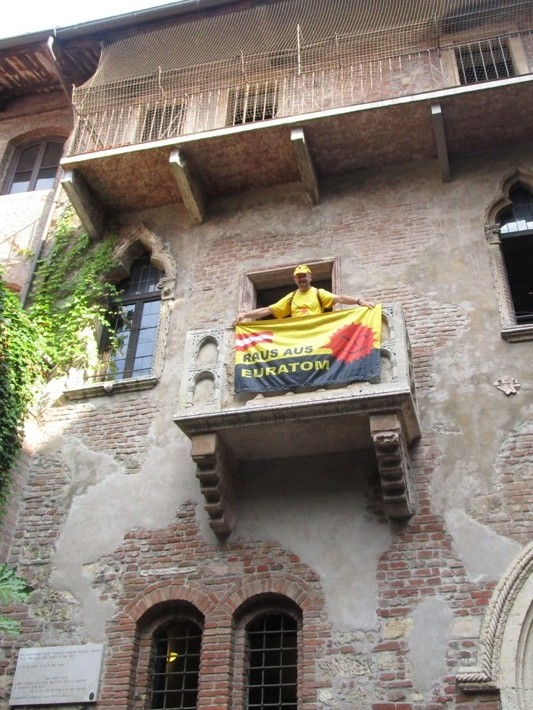
Juliet's house in Verona

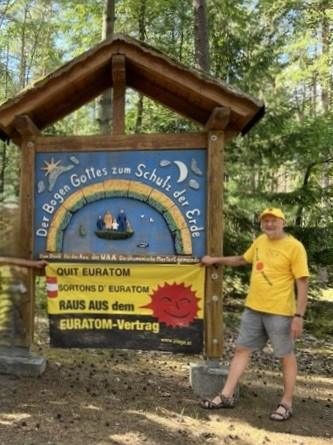
Franziskus-Marterl in Bavaria

== Awards and honors ==
- 1998: Environmental Protection Award of the City of Linz – "Strahlende Wecker" (Radiant Alarm Clocks)
- 1998: Environmental Protection Award of the State of Upper Austria – Remediation of ÖBB workplaces
- 2020: European Solar Prize (Eurosolar) – "Media and Communication" category – Short video "Quit EURATOM" (Stefanie and Thomas Neff)
- 2020: Decoration of Merit in Gold of the Republic of Austria
- 2022: Environmental Merit Award of the State of Salzburg for his tireless commitment to environmental and climate protection.

== Documentaries and interviews ==
- The Ailing Nuclear Industry – Short Video
- Quit Euratom - It's never too late!!
- PLAGE "Making Of" / Get Out of Euratom / Now or Never
- "Conversations on Life" Series with Thomas Neff
- Gold Medal of Merit for Thomas Neff
- Schleedorf Resident (Thomas Neff) Always Carries a Geiger Counter
- Five Past Twelve – An Upside-Down World; Get Out of Euratom – It's Too Late – It's Never Too Late!!
- No End to Fukushima – Solar Prize for Salzburg's PLAGE
- Climate peace diplomacy - Quit Euratrom - Eurosolar Turkey; interview with Thomas Neff, Eurosolar TV 2021

== Publications ==
- Thomas Neff: Radioaktive Belastung in der Arbeitswelt am Beispiel von Tachometern in ÖBB-Lokomotiven. Ein positives Beispiel verantwortungsbewußten Umgangs mit gefährlichen Stoffen. (Radioactive exposure in the workplace: the case of speedometers in ÖBB locomotives. A positive example of the responsible handling of hazardous substances.)
