= Schaden =

Schaden is a surname. Notable people with the surname include:

- Anna von Schaden (1763-1834), Austrian composer
- Chuck Schaden (born 1934), American radio personality and historian
- Heinz Schaden (born 1954), Austrian politician
- Otto Schaden (1937–2015), American Egyptologist
