= Wackersdorf Memorial (Salzburg) =

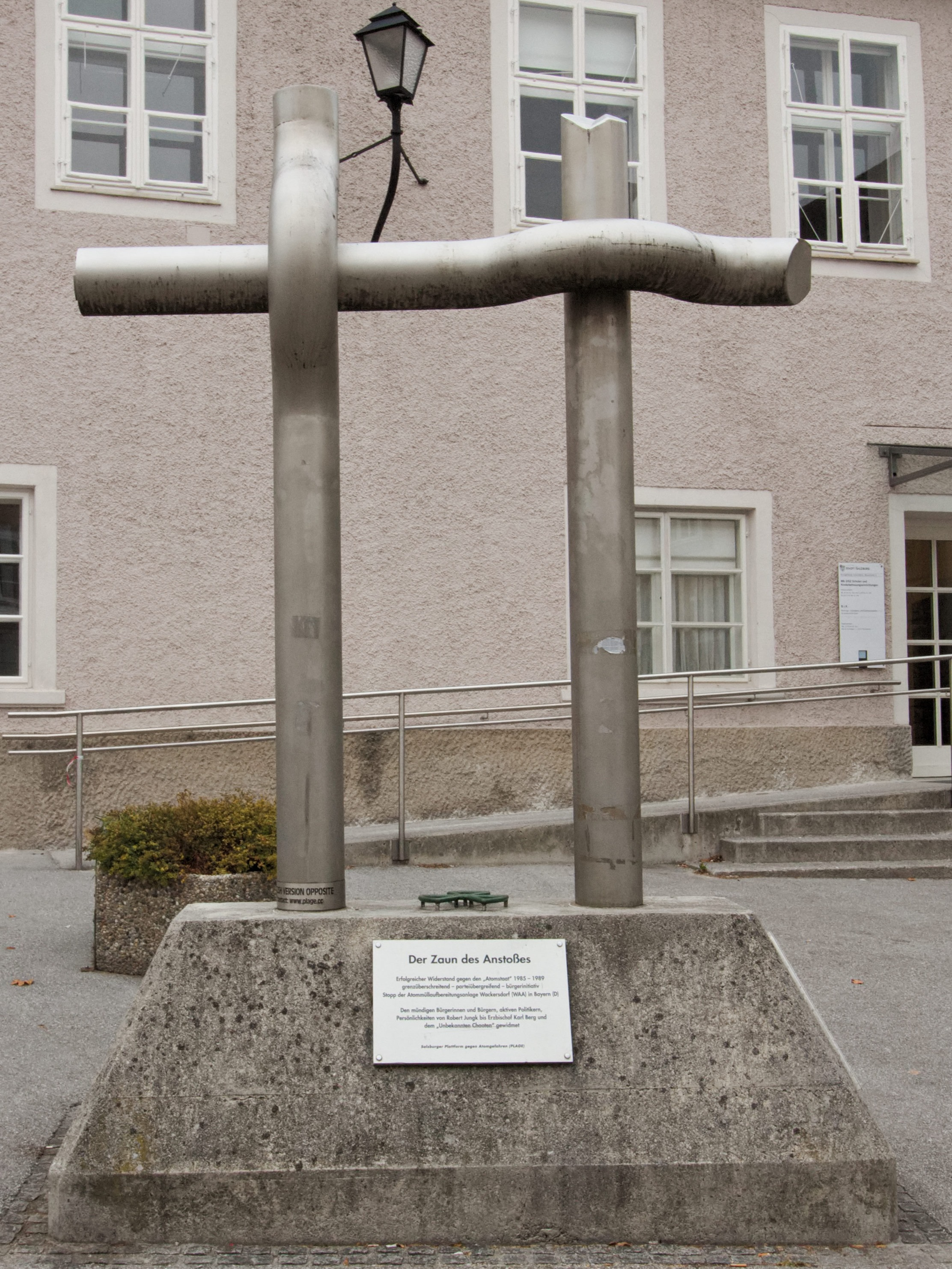
- Location: Salzburg, Austria
- Coordinates: 47°47′56.9″N 13°2′54.5″E
- Designer: Thomas Neff (environmentalist), PLAGE, ..
- Type: WAA-Protest-Memorial
- Material: Stainless steel
- Height: 3.5 m (11 ft)
- Opening date: July 2000

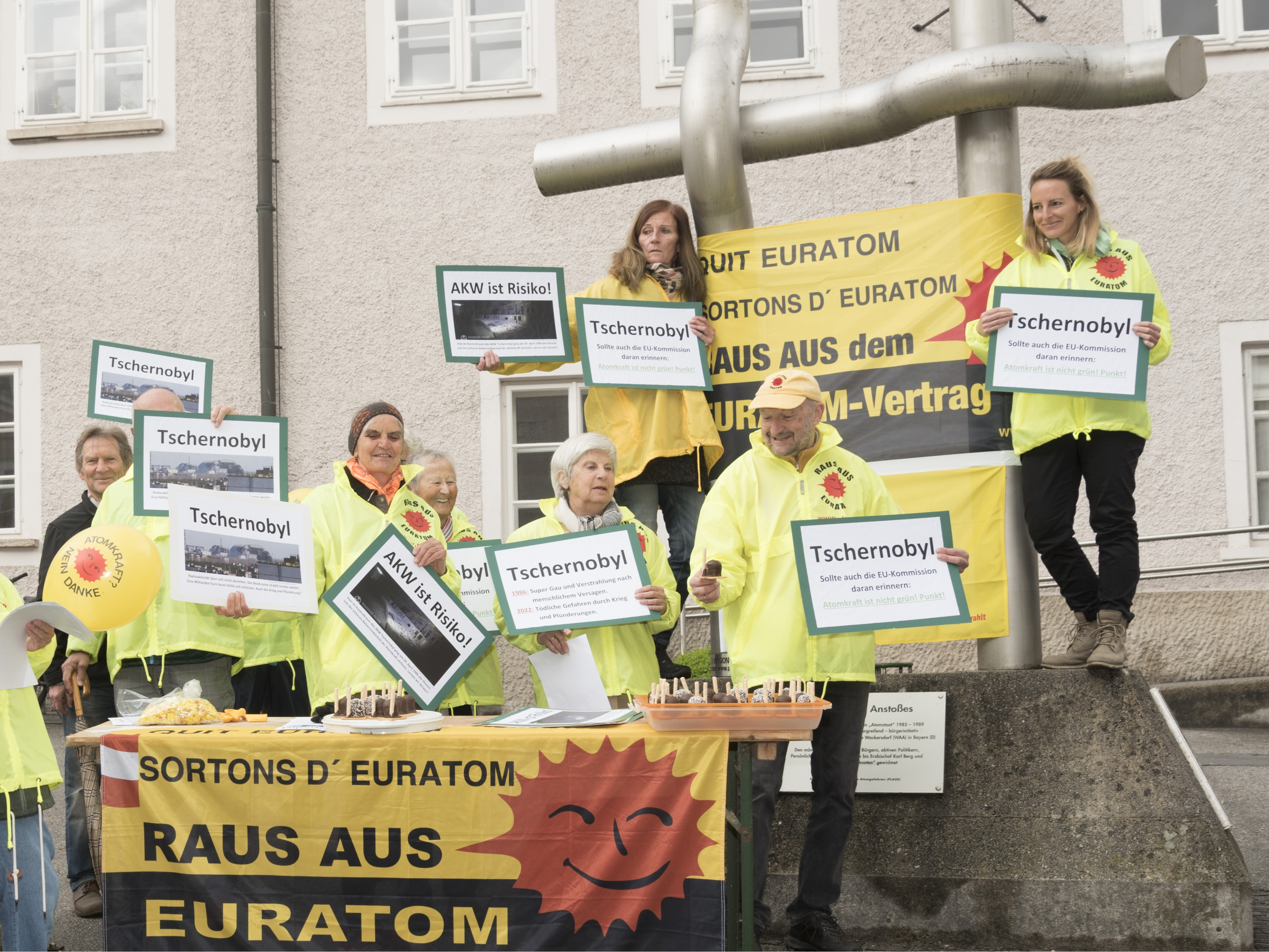
PLAGE activists demonstrate against Euratom (2022).

The Wackersdorf Memorial (Salzburg) is an Austrian monument located in Salzburg at Mozartplatz and commemorates the cross-border resistance of the Salzburg and Austrian populations against the Wackersdorf nuclear reprocessing plant (WAA) in Bavaria.

== Dedications ==
The Wackersdorf Memorial is dedicated to responsible citizens and active politicians, to figures ranging from Robert Jungk (futurist) to Karl Berg (Archbishop of Salzburg), and to the "Unknown Troublemaker". Peaceful demonstrators were also often labeled "troublemakers" by the state, and many local Upper Palatinate demonstrators proudly referred to themselves as "troublemakers".

== History ==
Eleven years after construction of the WAA was halted in 1989, the memorial was erected in 2000 by the Platform Against Nuclear Dangers Salzburg (PLAGE). The sculpture is designed in the form of a steel fence element. On July 20, 2000, at the opening of the Salzburg Festival, the Wackersdorf Memorial was unveiled and consecrated by Vinzenz Baldemair (Provost of Mattsee Abbey). Among those present were Hans Schuierer (former District Administrator of Schwandorf), Josef Reschen (former Mayor of Salzburg), and Mayor Heinz Schaden. The Bavarian Minister-President, Edmund Stoiber, was also invited.

In 2024, the Wackersdorf Memorial had to be removed for several months because a large transformer was being buried in the ground at the exact location of the memorial. The memorial was dismantled, stored temporarily, and then re-erected.

== Memorial inscriptions ==
The Wackersdorf memorial has bilingual inscriptions on three metal plaques at its concrete base, and the following is written on the left side of the construction fence: "English version opposite / Contact: www.plage.cc".

=== "Der Zaun des Anstoßes" ===
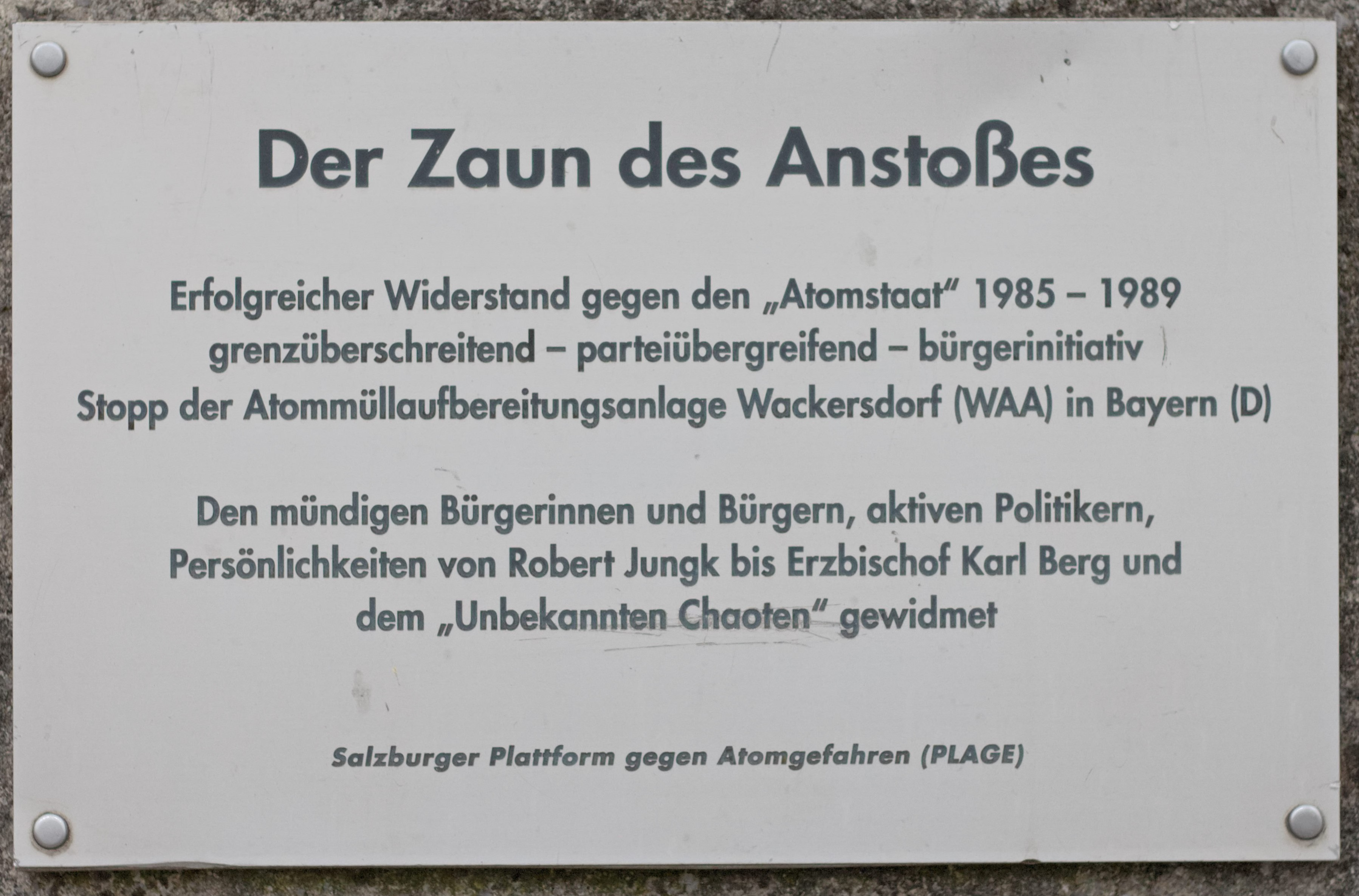
"Der Zaun des Anstoßes"

Der Zaun des Anstoßes
Erfolgreicher Widerstand gegen den „Atomstaat“ 1985–1989
grenzüberschreitend – parteiübergreifend – bürgerinitiativ
Stopp der Atommüllaufbereitungsanlage Wackersdorf (WAA) in Bayern (D)
Den mündigen Bürgerinnen und Bürgern, aktiven Politikern,
Persönlichkeiten von Robert Jungk bis Erzbischof Karl Berg und
dem „Unbekannten Chaoten“ gewidmet
Salzburger Plattform gegen Atomgefahren (PLAGE)

=== "The Fence of Capital Offence" ===
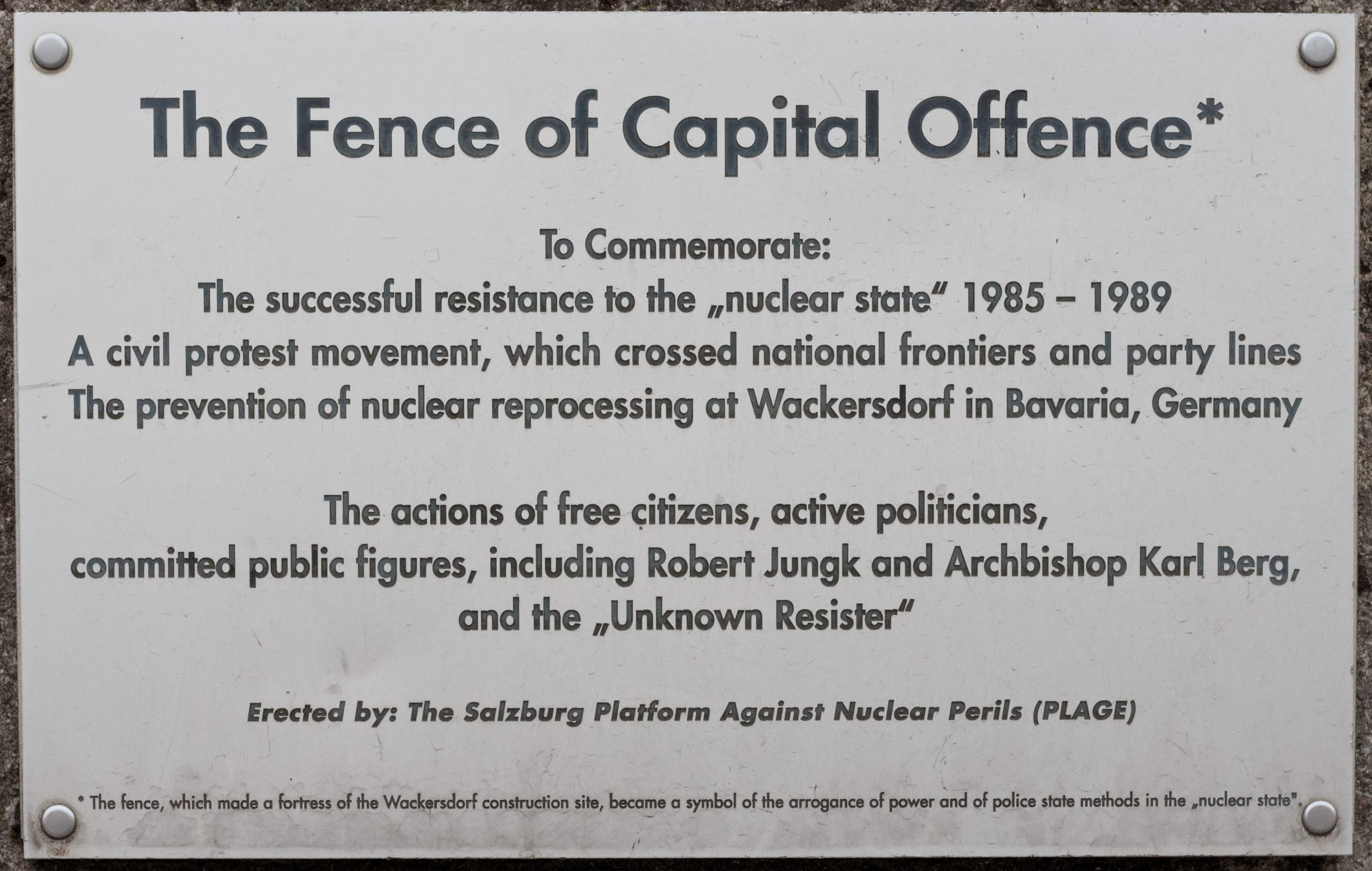
"The Fence of Capital Offence"

The Fence of Capital Offence*
To Commemorate:
The successful resistance to the „nuclear state“ 1985–1989
A civil protest movement, which crossed national frontiers and party lines. The prevention of nuclear reprocessing at Wackersdorf in Bavaria, Germany
The actions of free citizens, active politicians,
committed public figures, including Robert Jungk and Archbishop Karl Berg, and the „Unknown Resister“
Erected by: The Salzburg Platform Against Nuclear Perils (PLAGE)
* The fence, which made a fortress of the Wackersdorf construction site, became a symbol of the arrogance of power and of police state methods in the „nuclear state“.

=== "Widerstands-DenkMal – WAA-Bauzaun" ===
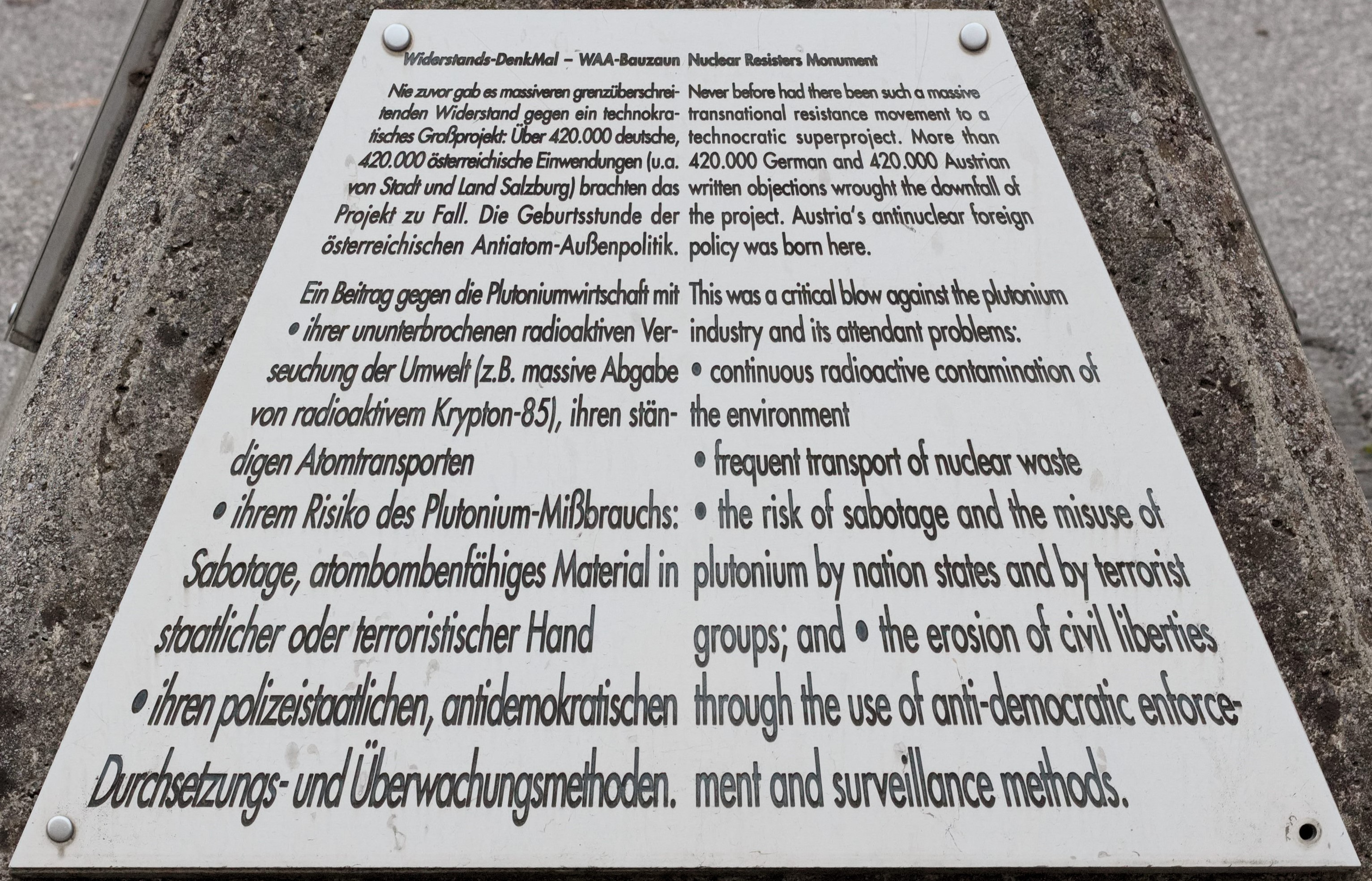
"Widerstands-DenkMal – WAA-Bauzaun" / "Nuclear Resisters Monument"

Widerstands-DenkMal – WAA-Bauzaun
Nie zuvor gab es massiveren grenzüberschreitenden Widerstand gegen ein technokratisches Großprojekt: Über 420.000 deutsche, 420.000 österreichische Einwendungen (u. a. von Stadt und Land Salzburg) brachten das Projekt zu Fall. Die Geburtsstunde der österreichischen Antiatom-Außenpolitik.
Ein Beitrag gegen die Plutoniumwirtschaft mit
* ihrer ununterbrochenen radioaktiven Verseuchung der Umwelt (z. B. massive Abgabe von radioaktivem Krypton-85)
* ihren ständigen Atomtransporten
* ihrem Risiko des Plutonium-Mißbrauchs: Sabotage, atombombenfähiges Material in staatlicher oder terroristischer Hand
* ihren polizeistaatlichen, antidemokratischen Durchsetzungs- und Überwachungsmethoden.

=== "Nuclear Resisters Monument" ===
Nuclear Resisters Monument
Never before had there been such a massive transnational resistance movement to a technocratic superproject. More than 420.000 German and 420.000 Austrian written objections wrought the downfall of the project. Austria's antinuclear foreign policy was born here.
This was a critical blow against the plutonium industry and its attendant problems: ´
* continuous radioactive contamination of the environment
* frequent transport of nuclear waste
* the risk of sabotage and the misuse of plutonium by nation states and by terrorist groups; and
* the erosion of civil liberties through the use of anti-democratic enforcement and surveillance methods.

== See also ==
- List of memorials related to the Wackersdorf reprocessing plant
