= Georg Eder =

Austrian Roman Catholic bishop

- Archbishop of Salzburg
- Church: Catholic Church
- Archdiocese: Archdiocese of Salzburg
- In office: 17 January 1989 – 23 November 2002
- Predecessor: Karl Berg
- Successor: Alois Kothgasser

Orders
- Ordination: 15 July 1956 by Andreas Rohracher
- Consecration: 26 February 1989 by Karl Berg

Personal details
- Born: 6 March 1928 Mattsee, Austria
- Died: 19 September 2015 (aged 87) Mattsee, Austria
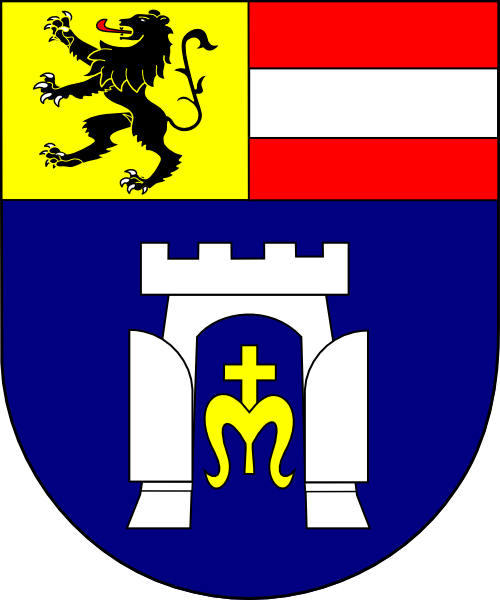
- Coat of arms

Georg Eder (6 March 1928 – 19 September 2015) was an Austrian Roman Catholic bishop. Because of his strict conservatism, reported one obituary, he was frequently the center of public controversy.

Eder was born in Mattsee and ordained a priest on 15 July 1956. He served the diocese of Salzburg throughout his career. Even before becoming archbishop he regularly wrote letters to newspaper editors expressing his conservative views.

He was chosen to be Archbishop of Salzburg becoming on 21 December 1988, and following papal approval was consecrated on 26 February 1989 by his predecessor Karl Berg. That year he said AIDS was "a punishment from God for unnatural sexual behavior"; he opposed abortion even in cases of rape, reporting he had read that it rarely results in conception. He also opposed sex education programs. In 2000, he insisted that the memorial service for the victims of the Kaprun disaster include a Eucharist, which prevented the head of the evangelical church from participating. This provoked the greatest number of withdrawals from the church registers in the history of the Archdiocese.

Pope John Paul II accepted his resignation, which he offered before his 75th birthday because he was incapable of further service, on 23 November 2002.

He died on 19 September 2015 after a long illness having recently moved from Salzburg to a retirement home in his hometown.
