= Platform Against Nuclear Dangers Salzburg =

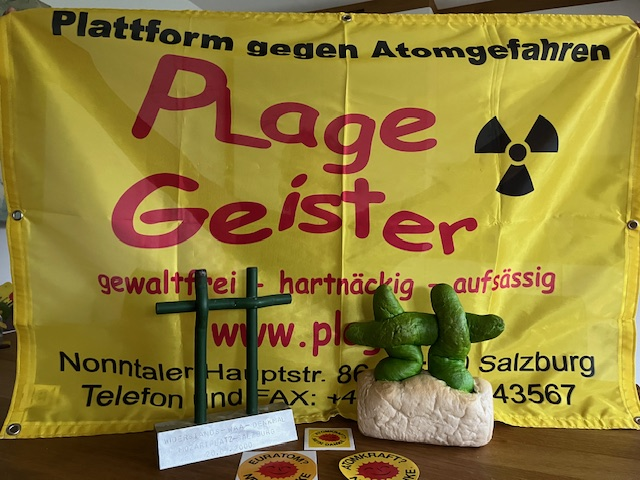
- Plattform gegen Atomgefahren
- Formation: 1986; 40 years ago
- Type: anti-nuclear organization
- Legal status: nonprofit organization
- Headquarters: Salzburg (Austria)
- Official language: German
- Leader: Peter Machart
- Website: https://www.plage.at/

The Platform Against Nuclear Dangers Salzburg (PLAGE) (German: Plattform gegen Atomgefahren Salzburg) is an anti-nuclear organization in Salzburg (Austria). It is part of the Anti-nuclear movement in Austria and is committed, among other things, to the withdrawal from the Euratom Treaty and to renewable energies. The PLAGE activists also call themselves PLAGE-Geister (nuisances).

== History ==
The PLAGE was founded on May 20, 1986, shortly after the Chernobyl disaster (April 26, 1986), as a Salzburg platform against the Wackersdorf reprocessing plant (WAA) (Überparteiliche Plattform gegen die WAA Wackersdorf). By 1987, 120,000 Salzburg signatures had been collected against the Bavarian reprocessing plant (a total of almost 900,000 objections, of which 453,000 were from Austria). In the spring of 1989 the decision was made not to build the reprocessing plant. After the WAA collapsed in 1989, the platform was renamed Platform Against Nuclear Dangers Salzburg (PLAGE).

== Wackersdorf Memorial ==
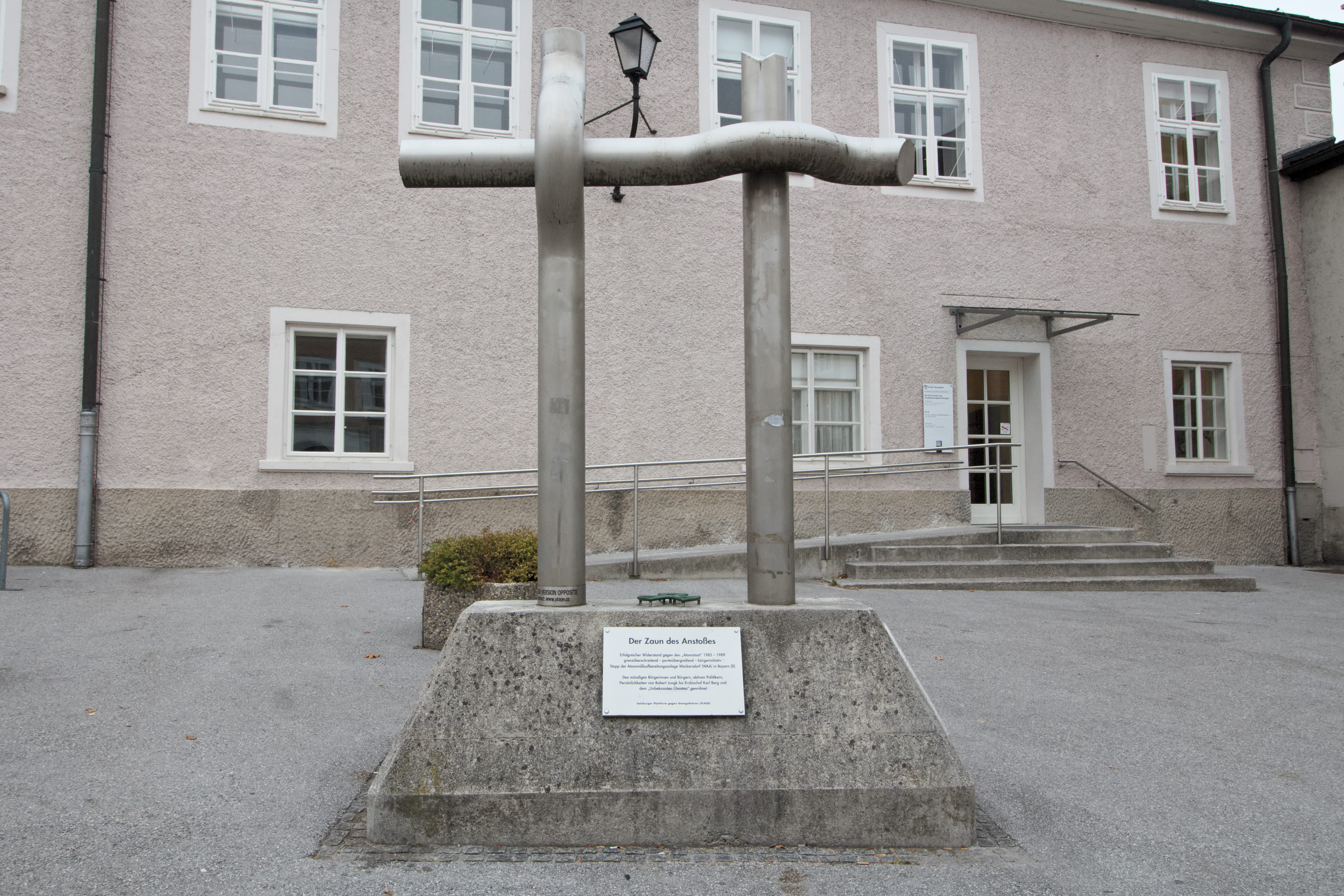
Wackersdorf Memorial (Salzburg)

In 2000, PLAGE erected the Wackersdorf Memorial (Salzburg) at Mozartplatz in Salzburg, which commemorates the resistance against the Bavarian Wackersdorf reprocessing plant. The PLAGE honored with the monument Robert Jungk, Archbishop Karl Berg and the civil resistance against the WAA Wackersdorf.

== Awards ==
- 2020 PLAGE got the European Solar Prize - Category "Media and Communication" - Short video "Quit EURATOM"

== Well-known members/activists ==
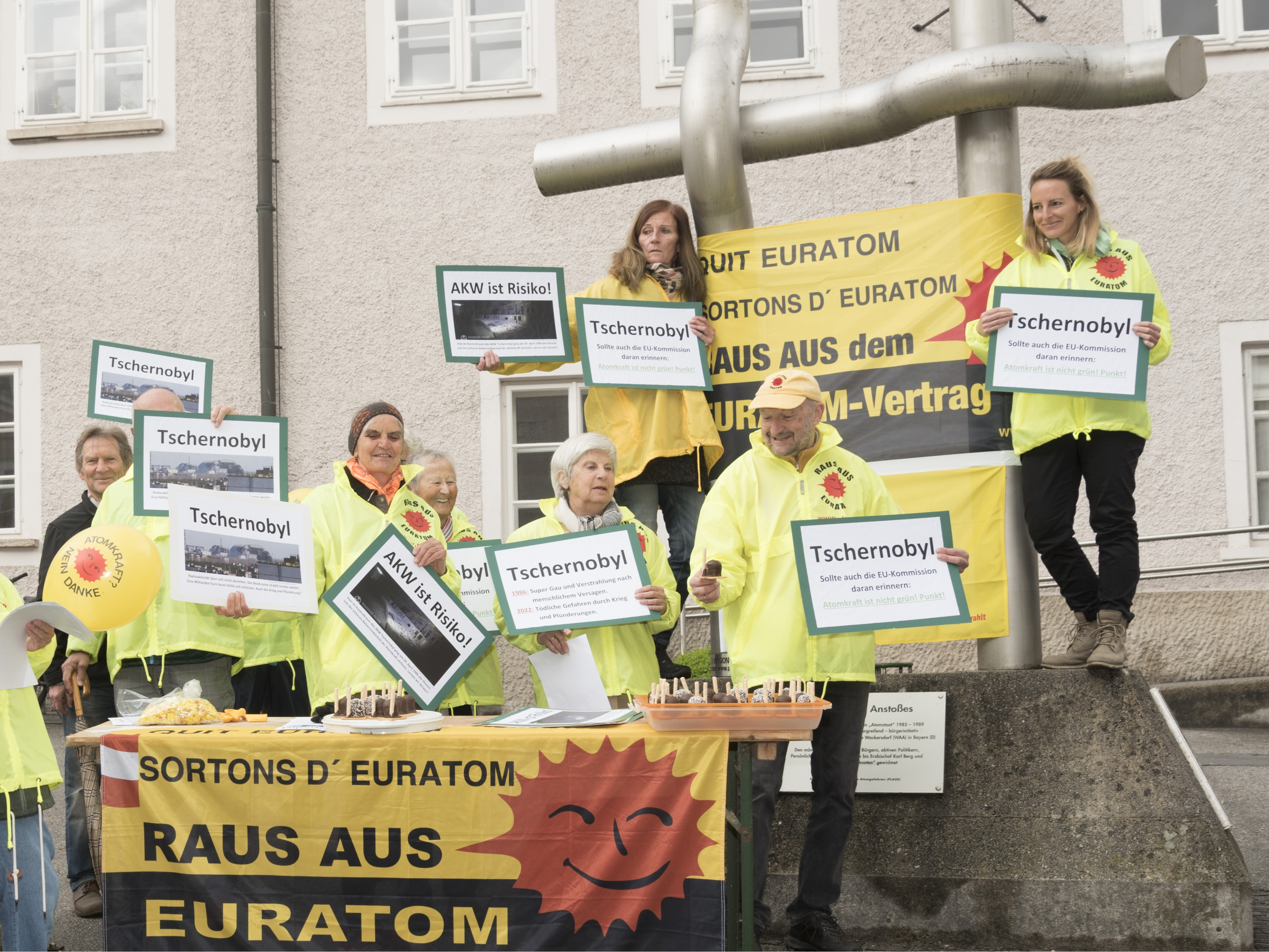
PLAGE activists demonstrate against the Euratom Treaty (2022)

- Heinz Stockinger: PLAGE founding member, Konrad Lorenz Prize, Nuclear-Free Future Award, etc.
- Hannes Augustin: biologist, PLAGE founding member, Konrad Lorenz Prize
- Thomas Neff (environmentalist): Action leader, Environmental Medal of Merit 2021, Golden Medal of Merit of the Republic of Austria, hunger strike against EURATOM, idea for the Wackersdorf Memorial
