= Mozartplatz =

Square in the old city of Salzburg, Austria

Coordinates: 47°47′56″N 13°02′51″E

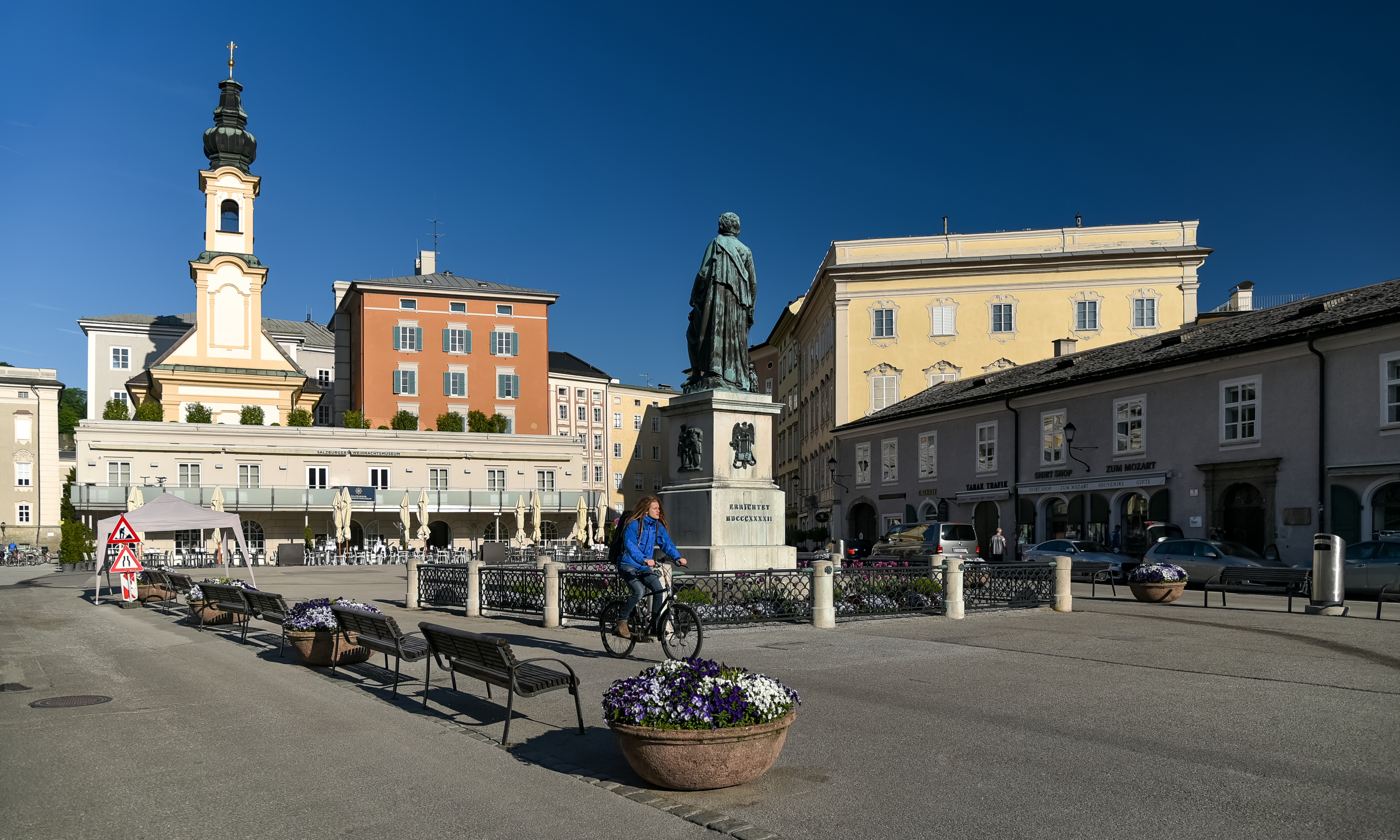
Square and statue, viewed looking westward

Mozartplatz, formerly known as Michaelsplatz, is a square in the historic centre (Altstadt) of Salzburg in Austria. In the centre of the square is a statue in memory of the composer Wolfgang Amadeus Mozart, who was born in the city and after whom the square is now named.

The square was created by Prince-Archbishop Wolf Dietrich von Raitenau who ordered the demolition of a number of houses on this site in the early 17th century. Originally the centre-piece of the square was a baroque fountain with a statue of St. Michael, but this was removed in 1841 to make way for the statue of Mozart.

On the north side of the square, the low Imhofstöckl houses the city's tourist information office. Behind the Imhofstöckl is part of the old city wall, which dates from the time of Prince-Archbishop Paris Lodron (1619–1653). Opposite, on the south side, is the Neue Residenz, home to the Salzburg Museum. On the east side of the square, three houses have a uniform facade and date from the 17th century. Of these, number 8 was the home of Constanze Mozart-Nissen, Mozart's widow. On the west side are the Salzburg Christmas Museum and the Café Glockenspiel, and in the south-west corner the Mozartplatz opens into the adjacent Residenzplatz.

== Mozart Memorial ==
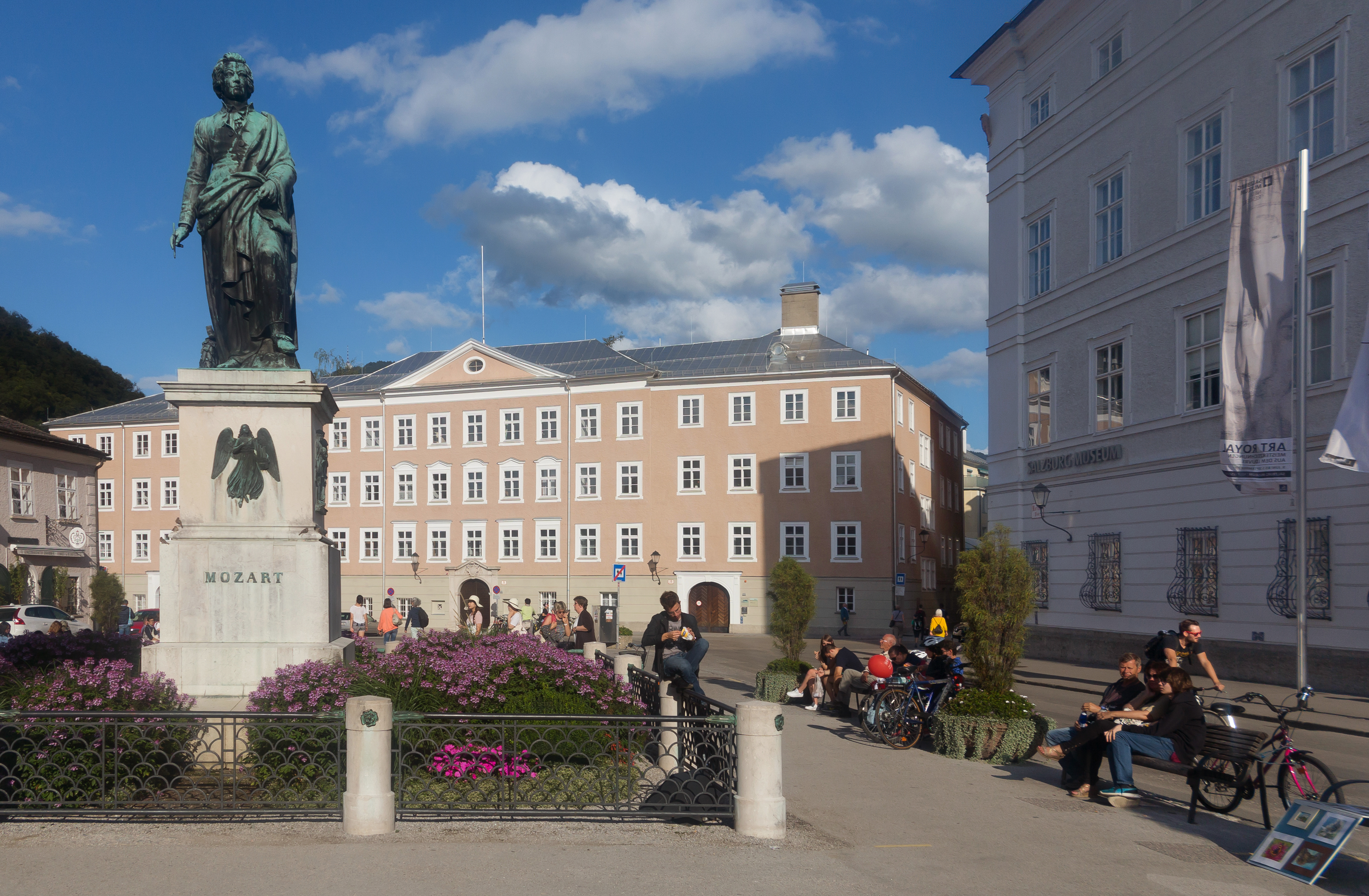
Statue and square, viewed looking eastward

In the centre of the Mozartplatz is the Mozartdenkmal (Mozart Monument), a statue of the composer by Ludwig Schwanthaler. The statue was to be unveiled in 1841 on the 50th anniversary of Mozart's death. However, this was delayed because a Roman mosaic had been found on the site selected for the statue. After the mosaic had been excavated, the statue was eventually unveiled on 4 September 1842. The marble pedestal on which the statue sits was donated by King Ludwig I of Bavaria.

A copy of the Roman mosaic can still be found at the foot of the statue, and bears an inscription: "hic habitat (felicitas), nihil intret mali", meaning "Here lives (the luck or happiness), nothing evil might enter".

== Wackersdorf Memorial ==
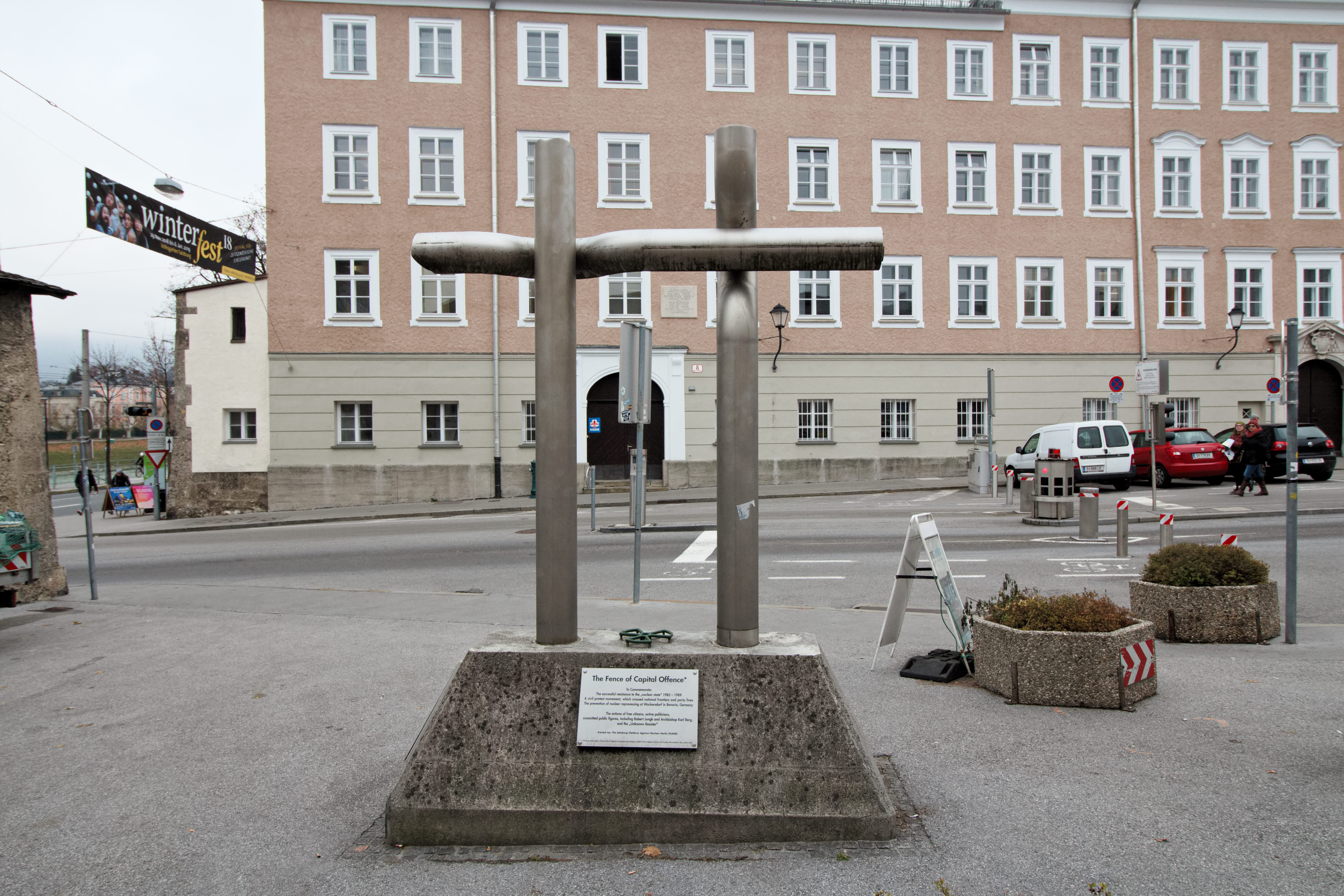
Wackersdorf Memorial

The Wackersdorf Memorial (Salzburg) was erected in 2000 by the Platform Against Nuclear Dangers Salzburg (PLAGE).
Inscription:
The Fence of Capital Offence ^{*}
To Commemorate:
The successful resistance to the "nuclear state" 1985 - 1989
A civil protest movement, which crossed national frontiers and party lines
The prevention of nuclear reprocessing at Wackersdorf in Bavaria, Germany
The actions of free citizens, active politicians, committed public figures, including Robert Jungk and Archbishop Karl Berg, and the "Unknown Resister"
Erected by: The Salzburg Platform Against Nuclear Perils (PLAGE)
^{* The fence, which made a fortress of the Wackersdorf construction site, became a symbol of the arrogance of power and of police state methods in the "nuclear state".}
