= Saunigl =

19th-century Austrian card game

Saunigl or Saunigeln was a 19th-century Austrian card game of the shedding type in which the last player left with cards was the Saunigel and risked suffering a beating by the first player out. It may be related to modern Fingerkloppe in which losers also receive a physical punishment, albeit on a lesser scale.

== Name ==
The world Saunigel in the Austrian dialect is recorded as early as 1784 and meant "sow hedgehog", (Note: Saunigel is a compound of Sau and Igel, the "n" being a Fugenlaut - joining letter.) but was also a pejorative term for a "dirty person" as well as a card game in which the last player left holding cards in hand was called the Saunigl.

The game is mentioned during the 19th century in Viennese publications but also in a Carinthian dictionary and dialect dictionary for the region south of the Enns.

== History ==
The game is recorded as early as 1814 in a Viennese play where a poor poet is likened to a Saunigl player, suggesting the game would have been well known at the time. In Doctor Faust's Mantel (Müller 1819), Fledermaus says "We have work to do, we're playing Saunigl." It is also recorded in the German translation of Jacques Offenbach's operetta Les Deux Aveugles where Jeržabek says he can play Preferance, Mariagel, Saunigl, Black Peter and Macao. Despite losing a large sum in Tarok, he ventures to play again.

In 1870, Saunigeln is described alongside Schanzeln, Zwicken, Brantln, Mauschln and Schmaraggln as a popular card game in southern Germany, played with German-suited cards. (Note: All are recognised card games apart from Schmarragln which may have been purely a skittles game.)

== Play ==
No detailed description is given, however several sources say that the last player with cards loses and is called the Saunigl. (Note: See for example, Castelli (1847) and von Sonnleiter (1811).) One source says that the winner, the first player out, beats the loser with a cloth twisted into a whip. Another says the game bears great similarity to Ecarté.

== Poem ==
In the 1860 poem The Playing of Cards (Das Kartenspielen) by J. B. Moser, there is the following description of Saunigl:

Bei jenem Spiel, das's Kind, was kaum recht laufen kann, schon kennt,
Das man - warum, das weiß ich nicht - gemein "Saunigeln" nennt,
Da spiel'n's, ich glaub' was Dummer's gibt's wohl nimmer auf der Welt,
Da spiel'n sie um diverse Schläg, anstatt um's baare Geld,
Da nimmt der Erste der da g'winnt, voll Freud in einem Rand,
Ein'n Plumpsack wie der größte Heilingstritzel groß in d'Hand;
Und schlagt den Letzten, weil der Letzte allemal verspielt,
Die Haut so voll, daß ihm sein' Hand wie eine Blunzen g'schwillt;
Daß jeder Daum'n an jeder Hand ein' Leberwurst formirt,
Daß jeder kleine Finger wie ein Nudelwalker wird.

Refrain: Drum glaub ich auch etc.

In that game – which even a child who can barely walk already knows –
That is commonly called "Saunigeln" - I don't know why –
I don't think there's anything stupider in the world than playing it,
They play for a thrashing instead of money,
The first one, the one who wins, full of joy, grabs the end
Of a Plumpsack (Note: Originally a twisted cloth for beating someone, like a towel whip. See Kaltschmidt (1834), p. 697.) as big as the biggest Heilingstritzel (Note: a large loaf made for All Saints Day. See Kretzenbacher (1959), p. 103.) in his hand;
And beats the one who came last, because the last one always loses,
His skin is so sore that his hand swells like a ball of blood;
So that each thumb becomes a liver sausage on each hand,
And every little finger becomes like a rolling pin.

Refrain: I think so too, etc.

== Bibliography ==
- _ (1895). Verein für Geschichte der Deutschen in Böhmen, Prague.
- Bäuerle, Adolf (1819). Doctor Faust's Mantel. Vienna: Grund.
- Castelli, Ignaz Franz (1847). Wörterbuch der Mundart in Österreich unter der Enns. Vienna: Tendler.
- Ebersburg, Ottokar Franz (1870). Tage-Buch des Kikiriki.
- Gewey, Franz-Xaver-Carl (1814). "Die" Jungfrau von Wien. Vienna: Wallishausser.
- Kaltschmidt, Jakob Heinrich (1834). Kurzgefaßtes, vollständiges, stamm- und sinnverwandtschaftliches Gesammt-Wörterbuch der deutschen Sprache. Leipzig.
- Korabinsky, Johann Matthias (1784). Beschreibung der königl. ungarischen Haupt-, Frey- und Krönungsstadt Preßburg. Volume 1. Preßburg: Korabinsky.
- Kretzenbacher, Leopold (1959). "Altsteirischer Allerseelenbrauch" in Blätter für Heimatkunde, 33rd Year, Issue 4. Graz: Historischer Verein für Steiermark.
- Moser, Johann Baptist (1860). Advokat und Klient. Vienna: Jacob Dirnbäck.
- Offenbach, Jacques (1911). Die beiden Blinden. Operetta. Berlin:
- Von Sonnleiter, Ignaz (1811). Idioticon Austriacum, das ist: Mundart der Oesterreicher, oder Kern ächt österreichischer Phrasen und Redensarten. 1st edn. Vienna: Wimmer. p. 120.
