= Munderfing =

- Municipality
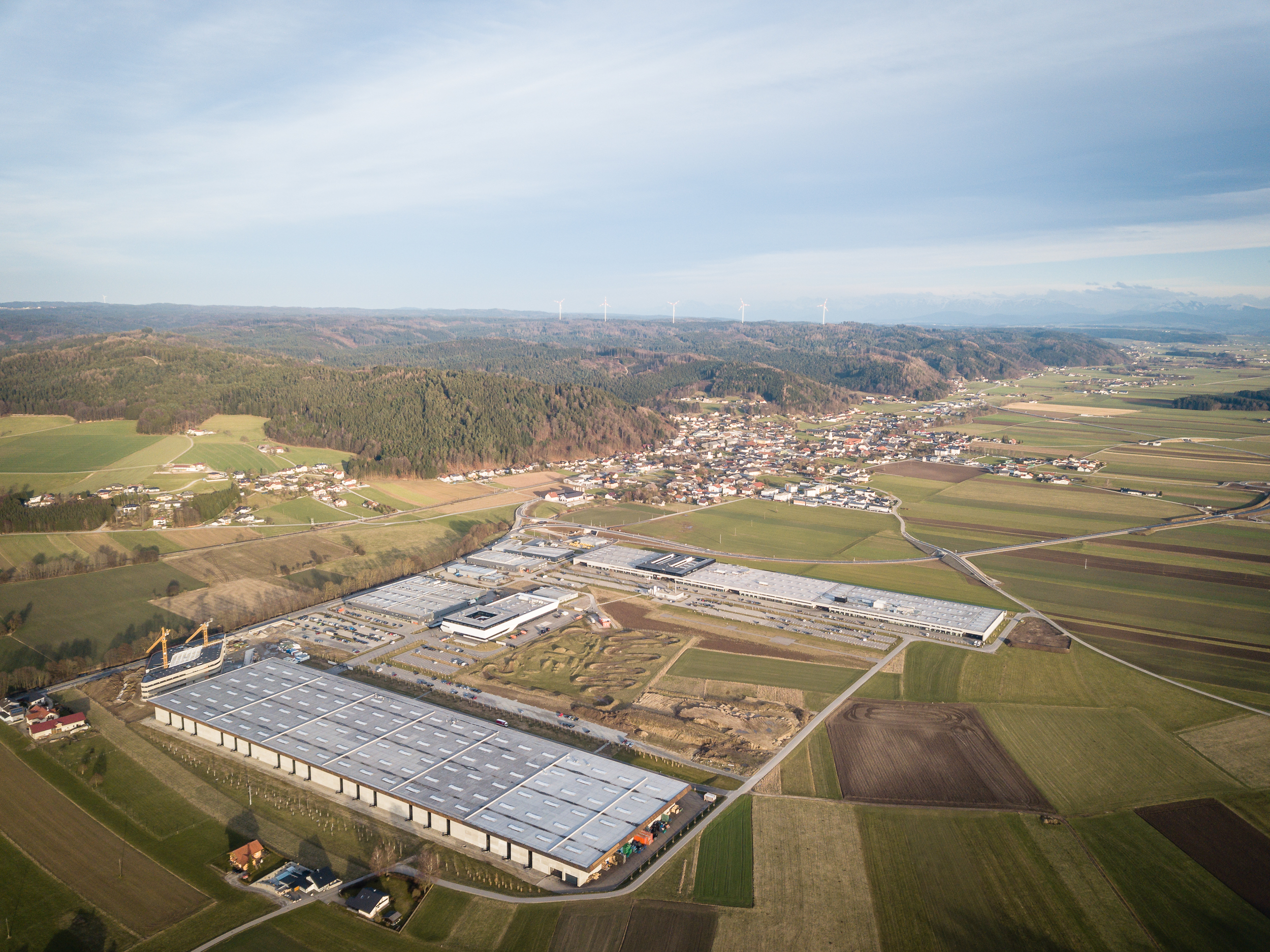

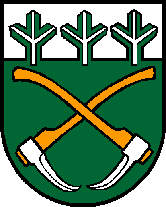
- Coat of arms

- Location within Austria
- Coordinates: 48°04′00″N 13°11′00″E
- Country: Austria
- State: Upper Austria
- District: Braunau am Inn

Government
  - Mayor: Martin Voggenberger (ÖVP)

Area
  - Total: 31.09 km^{2} (12.00 sq mi)
- Elevation: 468 m (1,535 ft)

Population (2016-01-01)
  - Total: 2,963
  - Density: 95.30/km^{2} (246.8/sq mi)
- Time zone: UTC+1 (CET)
  - Summer (DST): UTC+2 (CEST)
- Postal code: 5222
- Area code: 07744
- Vehicle registration: BR
- Website: www.munderfing.at

Munderfing is a municipality in the district of Braunau am Inn in the Austrian state of Upper Austria.

== Geography ==
Munderfing lies on the western edge of the Kobernauß forest in the Innviertel. About 57 percent of the municipality is forest and 38 percent farmland.
