= Karl Berg =

Austrian Catholic archbishop (1908–1997)

The Most Reverend Karl Berg
- Archbishop of Salzburg
- Church: Catholic Church
- Archdiocese: Salzburg
- Appointed: 26 December 1972 by Pope Paul VI
- Term ended: 5 September 1988
- Predecessor: Eduard Macheiner
- Successor: Georg Eder

Orders
- Ordination: 29 October 1933
- Consecration: 25 February 1973 by Andreas Rohracher

Personal details
- Born: 27 December 1908 Radstadt, Austria-Hungary
- Died: 1 September 1997 (aged 88) Vienna, Austria
- Motto: Latin: Uni Trinoque Domino (To the One and Threefold Lord)
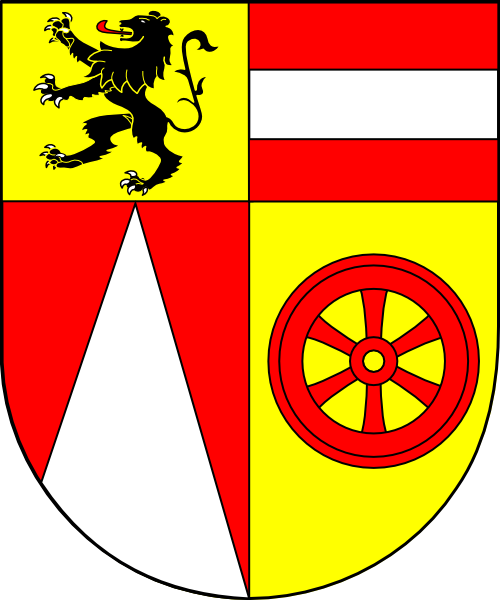
- Coat of arms: Karl Berg's coat of arms

Karl Berg (27 December 1908 – 1 September 1997) was an Austrian Catholic cleric and Archbishop of Salzburg from 1973 to 1988.

== Life ==
Berg was born on 27 December 1908 in the Austrian town of Radstadt. He was ordained into priesthood on 29 October 1933. Following his selection as Archbishop of Salzburg in 1972, he was confirmed on 9 January 1973. He held the post until his retirement on 5 September 1988. From 1985 to 1988, he was president of the Austrian Bishops' Conference. He died on 1 September 1997.

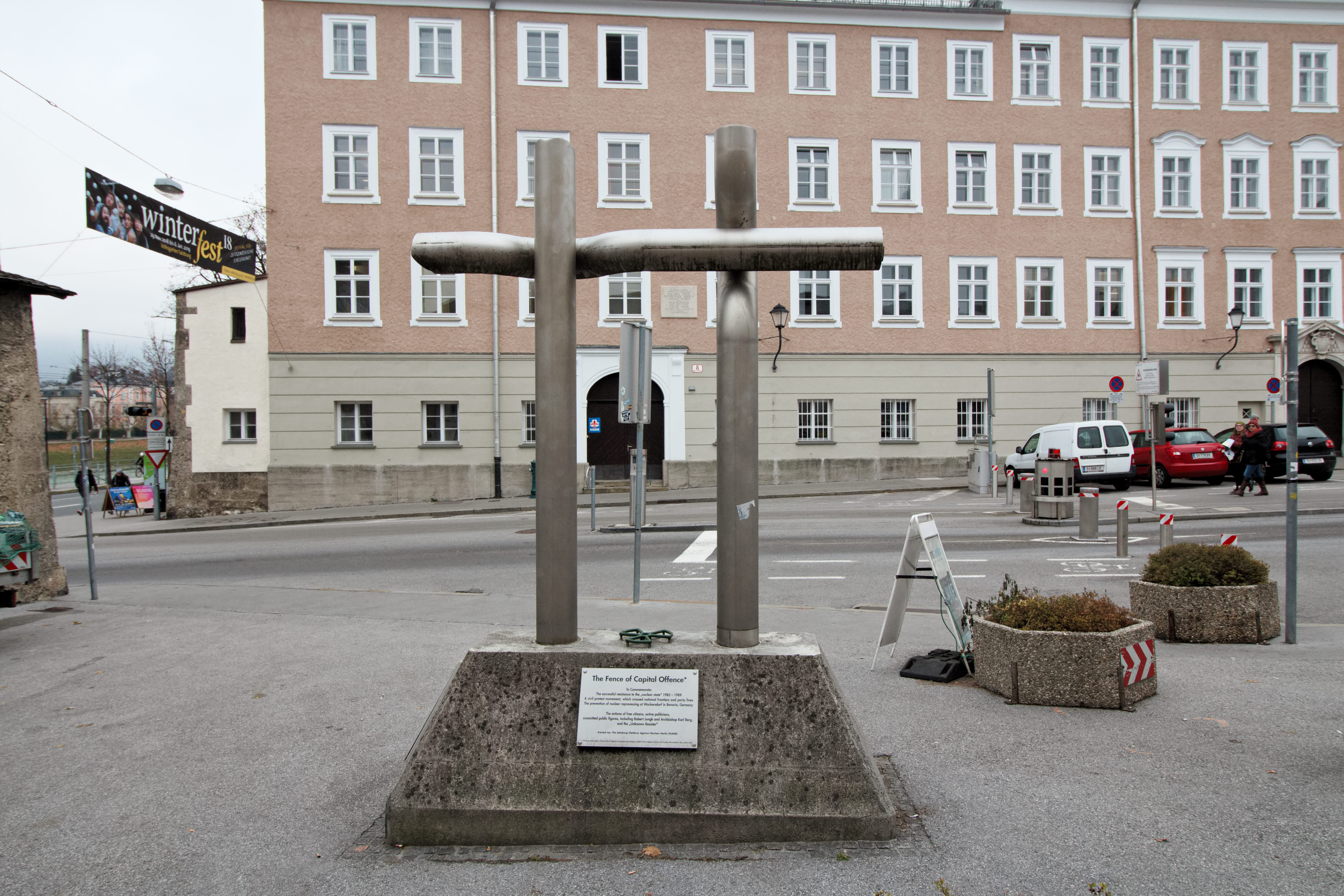
Anti-WAA Memorial on Mozartplatz

The anti-Wackersdorf reprocessing plant-monument on Mozartplatz (Salzburg) is, among others also dedicated to him.

His motto was Uni Trinoque Domino, which is translated from Latin as "To the One and Threefold Lord".
