= Heinz Schaden =

Austrian politician

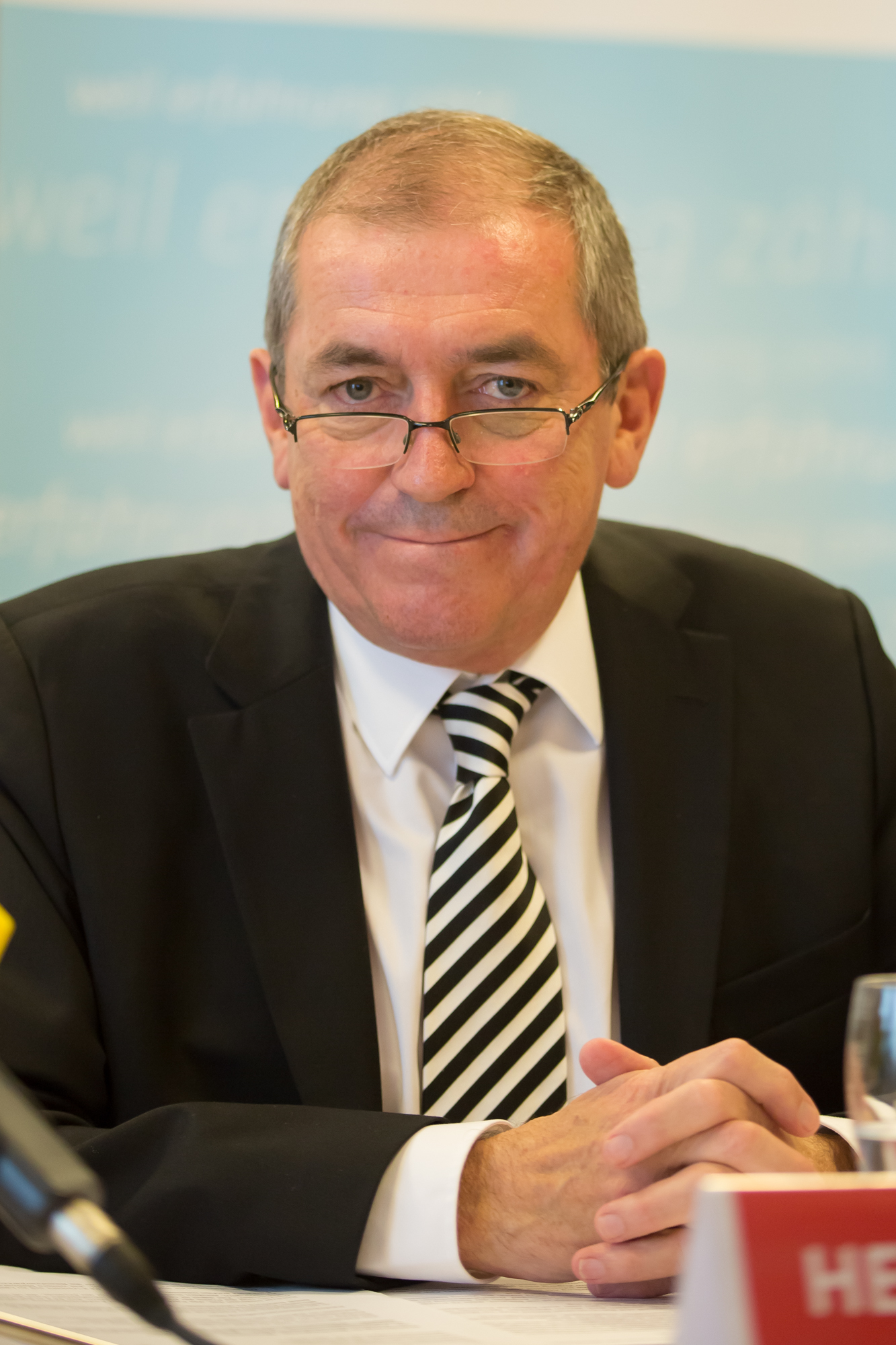
Heinz Schaden in 2015

Heinz Schaden (born April 29, 1954) is an Austrian politician of the Social Democratic Party of Austria (SPÖ) and was the mayor of Salzburg from 1999 to 2017.

Schaden studied political science and journalism at Salzburg University, and did his doctorate there in 1981, before studying in Vienna until 1985. On April 30, 1999, he became the first directly elected mayor of Salzburg. He also won the mayoral election of 7 March 2004, with 52% of the vote.

He was also Chairman of the SPÖ in Salzburg.

Schaden survived the Costa Concordia disaster in 2012.
