= Thomas Eckersley =

British physicist

Thomas Eckersley FRS
- Eckersley from the National Portrait Gallery, London
- Born: Thomas Lydwell Eckersley; 27 December 1886; 4 Marlborough Place Marylebone
- Died: 15 February 1959 (aged 72); Manor House, Danbury, Essex
- Education: Bedales School; University College London; University of Cambridge
- Known for: Work on the ionosphere and radio propagation
- Spouse: Eva Amelia Pain
- Children: 3
- Family: Peter Eckersley (brother); Thomas Henry Huxley (grandfather); Henrietta A. Huxley (grandmother); Marian Huxley (aunt); Leonard Huxley (uncle); Aldous Huxley (cousin)
- Awards: FRS (1938); Faraday Medal, IET (1951)
- Scientific career
- Workplaces: NPL; Marconi's Wireless Telegraph Company Ltd

Thomas Lydwell Eckersley FRS (27 December 1886 – 15 February 1959) was an English theoretical physicist and engineer.

== Biography ==
Eckersley was born in St John's Wood, London, the second of three sons of William Alfred, a civil engineer, and Rachel, fifth child of Thomas Henry Huxley. After early years in Mexico, he attended Bedales School from age 11, where he became very interested in mathematics. Then, at 15, he went to University College London, to read engineering. He discovered that the subject was not for him, and was awarded a second class degree. He joined the National Physical Laboratory (NPL), where he worked on the behaviour of iron under the influence of alternating magnetic fields.

He left the NPL in 1910 to read mathematics at Cambridge, and gained a BA degree in 1912. After a short time in the Cavendish Laboratory he left to join the Egyptian Government Survey as an Inspector (1913–14). When war started he took a commission in the Royal Engineers and worked on problems of wireless telegraphy. As a result, he developed a keen interest in the propagation of radio waves which was to remain with him for the rest of his life. In 1919 he joined Marconi's Wireless Telegraph Company Ltd, as a theoretical research engineer, and remained with them until he retired in 1946. A key piece of work in which he was involved was the analysis of the findings of the research team sent to Australia by the Marconi company to study long-wave propagation. The results were published in a classic paper.

In 1940, Eckersley joined the staff of the Air Ministry for secret work and in 1942 became Chief Scientific Adviser to the Interservice Ionosphere Bureau, established at the Marconi Research and Development Laboratories at Great Baddow. His contribution to radar techniques were important, especially in improving the radar detection of submarines.

He became a Fellow of the Royal Society in 1938 and was awarded the Faraday Medal of the Institution of Electrical Engineers in 1951.

=== Family ===
Thomas Lydwell Eckersley married Eva Amelia Pain, daughter of Barry Pain, the author; on 14 April 1920 at All Saints Church, St John’s Wood. They had three children: Noel, Sylvia and Shirley.

Eckersley suffered from multiple sclerosis following his retirement. He died at Manor House, Danbury, Essex on 15 February 1959, of pneumonia contracted during an epidemic of influenza.
