= Marian Collier =

Marian Collier may refer to:

- Marian Collier (actress) (1931–2021), American film and television actress
- Marian Collier (painter) (1859–1887), British painter
