= Thomas Henry Huxley =

English biologist (1825–1895)

The Right Honourable Thomas Henry Huxley FRS FLS HonFRSE
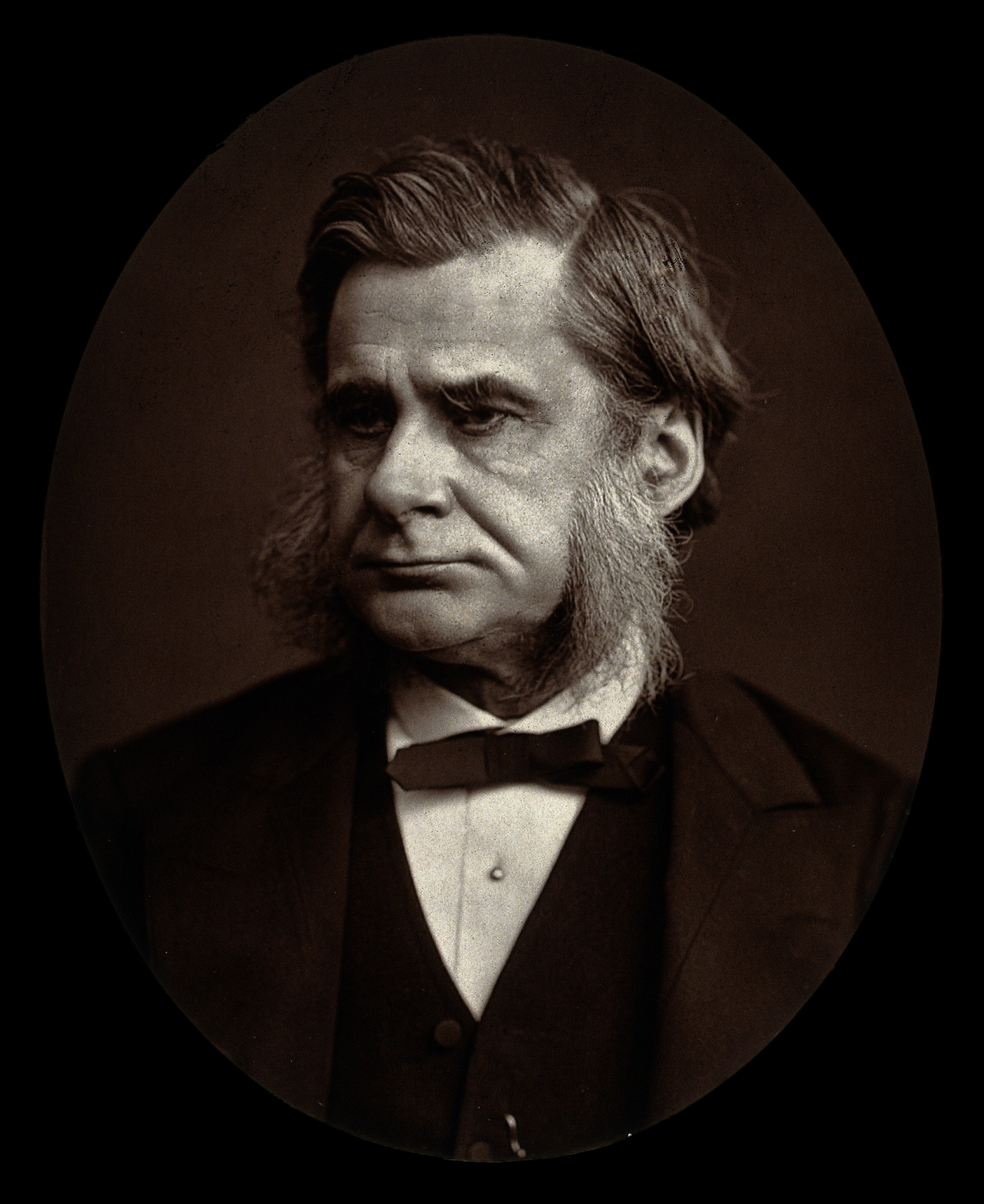
- Woodburytype print of Huxley (1880 or earlier)
- Born: 4 May 1825; Ealing, Middlesex, England
- Died: 29 June 1895 (aged 70); Eastbourne, Sussex, England
- Education: Sydenham College, London; Charing Cross Hospital
- Known for: Evolution, science education, agnosticism
- Spouse: Henrietta Heathorn (m. 1855)
- Children: 8; including Marian and Leonard
- Awards: Royal Medal (1852); Wollaston Medal (1876); Clarke Medal (1880); Copley Medal (1888); Linnean Medal (1890); Hayden Memorial Geological Award (1893)
- Scientific career
- Fields: Zoology; comparative anatomy
- Workplaces: Royal Navy, Royal College of Surgeons, Royal School of Mines, Royal Institution University of London
- Academic advisors: Thomas Wharton Jones
- Notable students: Michael Foster; H. G. Wells
- Author abbrev. (zoology): T.H. Huxley

Thomas Henry Huxley (4 May 1825 – 29 June 1895) was an English biologist and anthropologist who specialised in comparative anatomy. He has become known as "Darwin's Bulldog" for his advocacy of Charles Darwin's theory of evolution.

The stories regarding Huxley's famous 1860 Oxford evolution debate with Samuel Wilberforce were a key moment in the wider acceptance of evolution and in his own career, although some historians think that aspects of the surviving story of the debate are a later fabrication. Huxley had been planning to leave Oxford on the previous day, but, after an encounter with Robert Chambers, the author of Vestiges, he changed his mind and decided to join the debate. Wilberforce was coached by Richard Owen, against whom Huxley also debated about whether humans were closely related to apes.

Huxley was slow to accept some of Darwin's ideas, such as gradualism, and was undecided about natural selection, but despite this, he was wholehearted in his public support of Darwin. Instrumental in developing scientific education in Britain, he fought against the more extreme versions of religious tradition. Huxley coined the term agnosticism in 1869 and elaborated on it in 1889 to frame the nature of claims in terms of what is knowable and what is not.

Huxley had little formal schooling and was virtually self-taught. According to Edward Poulton, he became perhaps the finest comparative anatomist of the later 19th century. He worked on invertebrates, clarifying relationships between groups previously little understood. Later, he worked on vertebrates, especially on the relationship between non-human apes and humans. After comparing Archaeopteryx with Compsognathus, he correctly concluded that birds evolved from small carnivorous dinosaurs.

Huxley was best known for his controversial and energetic advocacy of evolution, which had significant effects on society in Britain and elsewhere. Huxley's 1893 Romanes Lecture, "Evolution and Ethics", is influential in China; the Chinese translation of Huxley's lecture transformed the Chinese translation of Darwin's On the Origin of Species.

Huxley was a member of the Huxley family, a prominent British family of scientists, writers, and public figures. He married Henrietta Anne Heathorn in 1855, and the couple had eight children.

== Early life ==
Thomas Henry Huxley was born in Ealing, then a village in Middlesex. He was the second youngest of eight children of George Huxley and Rachel Withers. His parents were members of the Church of England, but he sympathized with nonconformists. Like some other British scientists of the nineteenth century such as Alfred Russel Wallace, Huxley was brought up in a literate middle-class family which had fallen on hard times. His father was a mathematics schoolmaster at Great Ealing School until it closed, putting the family into financial difficulties. As a result, Thomas left school at the age of 10, after only two years of formal schooling.

Despite this lack of formal schooling, Huxley was determined to educate himself. He became one of the great autodidacts of the nineteenth century. At first he read Thomas Carlyle, James Hutton's Geology, and Sir William Hamilton's Logic. In his teens, he taught himself German, eventually becoming fluent and used by Charles Darwin as a translator of scientific material in German. He learned Latin, and enough Greek to read Aristotle in the original.

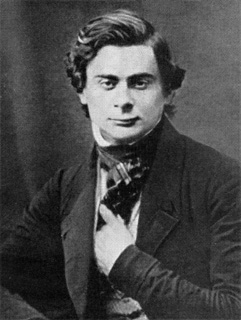
Huxley, aged 21

Later on, as a young adult, he made himself an expert, first teaching himself about invertebrates, and later on vertebrates. He did many of the illustrations for his publications on marine invertebrates. In his later debates and writing on science and religion, his grasp of theology was better than many of his clerical opponents.

He was apprenticed for short periods to several medical practitioners: at 13 to his brother-in-law John Cooke in Coventry, who passed him on to Thomas Chandler, notable for his experiments using mesmerism for medical purposes. Chandler's practice was in London's Rotherhithe amidst the squalor endured by the Dickensian poor. Afterward, another brother-in-law took him on: John Salt, his eldest sister's husband. Now aged 16, Huxley entered Sydenham College (behind University College Hospital), a cut-price anatomy school. All this time Huxley continued his programme of reading, which more than made up for his lack of formal schooling.

A year later, buoyed by excellent results and a silver medal prize in the Apothecaries' yearly competition, Huxley was admitted to study at Charing Cross Hospital, where he obtained a small scholarship. At Charing Cross, he was taught by Thomas Wharton Jones, Professor of Ophthalmic Medicine and Surgery at University College London. Jones had been Robert Knox's assistant when Knox bought cadavers from Burke and Hare. The young Wharton Jones, who acted as go-between, was exonerated of crime, but thought it best to leave Scotland. In 1845, under Wharton Jones' guidance, Huxley published his first scientific paper demonstrating the existence of a hitherto unrecognised layer in the inner sheath of hairs, a layer that has been known since as Huxley's layer. Later in life, Huxley organised a pension for his old mentor.

At twenty he passed his First M.B. examination at the University of London, winning the gold medal for anatomy and physiology. However, he did not present himself for the final (Second M.B.) exams and consequently did not qualify for a university degree. His apprenticeships and exam results formed a sufficient basis for his application to the Royal Navy.

== Voyage of the Rattlesnake ==
Aged 20, Huxley was too young to apply to the Royal College of Surgeons for a licence to practise, yet he was "deep in debt". So, at a friend's suggestion, he applied for an appointment in the Royal Navy. He had references on character and certificates showing the time spent on his apprenticeship and on requirements such as dissection and pharmacy. William Burnett, the Physician General of the Navy, interviewed him and arranged for the College of Surgeons to test his competence (by means of a viva voce).

H.M.S. Rattlesnake and Bramble, 1852, by the ship's artist Oswald Brierly

Men, woman, and child, Louisiades, New Guinea, ca. 1849, by Thomas Henry Huxley

Finally, Huxley was made Assistant Surgeon ('surgeon's mate', but in practice marine naturalist) to HMS Rattlesnake, about to set sail on a voyage of discovery and surveying to New Guinea and Australia. The Rattlesnake left England on 3 December 1846 and, once it arrived in the southern hemisphere, Huxley devoted his time to the study of marine invertebrates. He began to send details of his discoveries back to England, where publication was arranged by Edward Forbes FRS (who had also been a pupil of Knox). Both before and after the voyage Forbes was something of a mentor to Huxley.

Huxley's paper "On the anatomy and the affinities of the family of Medusae" was published in 1849 by the Royal Society in its Philosophical Transactions. Huxley united the Hydroid and Sertularian polyps with the Medusae to form a class to which he subsequently gave the name of Hydrozoa. The connection he made was that all the members of the class consisted of two cell layers, enclosing a central cavity or stomach. This is characteristic of the phylum now called the Cnidaria. He compared this feature to the serous and mucous structures of embryos of higher animals. When at last he got a grant from the Royal Society for the printing of plates, Huxley was able to summarise this work in The Oceanic Hydrozoa, published by the Ray Society in 1859.

The value of Huxley's work was recognised and, on returning to England in 1850, he was elected a Fellow of the Royal Society. In the following year, at the age of twenty-six, he not only received the Royal Society Medal but was also elected to the Council. He met Joseph Dalton Hooker and John Tyndall, who remained his lifelong friends. The Admiralty retained him as a nominal assistant-surgeon, so he might work on the specimens he collected and the observations he made during the voyage of the Rattlesnake.

He solved the problem of Appendicularia, whose place in the animal kingdom Johannes Peter Müller had found himself wholly unable to assign. It and the Ascidians are both, as Huxley showed, tunicates, today regarded as a sister group to the vertebrates in the phylum Chordata. Other papers on the morphology of the cephalopods and on brachiopods and rotifers are also noteworthy. The value of the work done on these voyages was also commemorated in the name of "Rattlesnake Island" off the coast of Queensland.

== Later life ==
Following a lecture at the Royal Institution on 30 April 1852, Huxley indicated that it remained difficult to earn a living as a scientist alone. This was demonstrated in a letter written on 3 May 1852, where he states "Science in England does everything—but PAY. You may earn praise but not pudding". However, Huxley effectively resigned from the navy by refusing to return to active service, and in July 1854 he became professor of natural history at the Royal School of Mines and naturalist to the British Geological Survey in the following year. In addition, he was Fullerian Professor at the Royal Institution 1855–1858 and 1865–1867; Hunterian Professor at the Royal College of Surgeons 1863–1869; president of the British Association for the Advancement of Science 1869–1870; president of the Quekett Microscopical Club 1878; president of the Royal Society 1883–1885; Inspector of Fisheries 1881–1885; and president of the Marine Biological Association 1884–1890. He was elected as a member to the American Philosophical Society in 1869.

The thirty-one years during which Huxley occupied the chair of natural history at the Royal School of Mines included work on vertebrate palaeontology and on many projects to advance the place of science in British life. Huxley retired in 1885, after a bout of depressive illness which started in 1884. He resigned the presidency of the Royal Society in mid-term, the Inspectorship of Fisheries, and his chair (as soon as he decently could) and took six months' leave. His pension was £1200 a year.

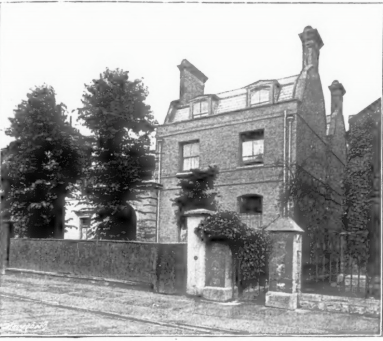
4 Marlborough Place, London

Huxley's London home, in which he wrote many of his works, was at 4 Marlborough Place, St John's Wood. The house was extended in the early 1870s to include a large drawing and dining room at which he held informal Sunday gatherings.

In 1890, he moved from London to Eastbourne, where he had purchased land in the Staveley Road upon which a house was built, 'Hodeslea', under the supervision of his son-in-law F. Waller. Here Huxley edited the nine volumes of his Collected Essays. In 1894 he heard of Eugene Dubois' discovery in Java of the remains of Pithecanthropus erectus (now known as Homo erectus).

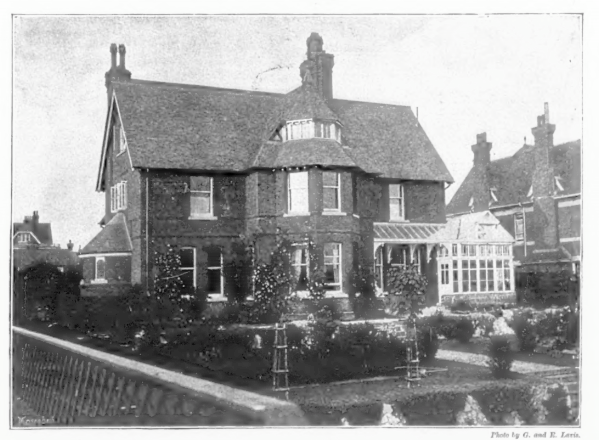
Hodeslea, Staveley Road, Eastbourne

He died of a heart attack (after contracting influenza and pneumonia) in 1895 in Eastbourne, and was buried in London at East Finchley Cemetery. No invitations were sent out but two hundred people turned up for the funeral; they included Joseph Dalton Hooker, William Henry Flower, Mulford B. Foster, Edwin Lankester, Joseph Lister, and apparently Henry James. The family plot had been purchased upon the death of his eldest son Noel, who died of scarlet fever in 1860; Huxley's wife Henrietta Anne née Heathorn and son Noel are also buried there.

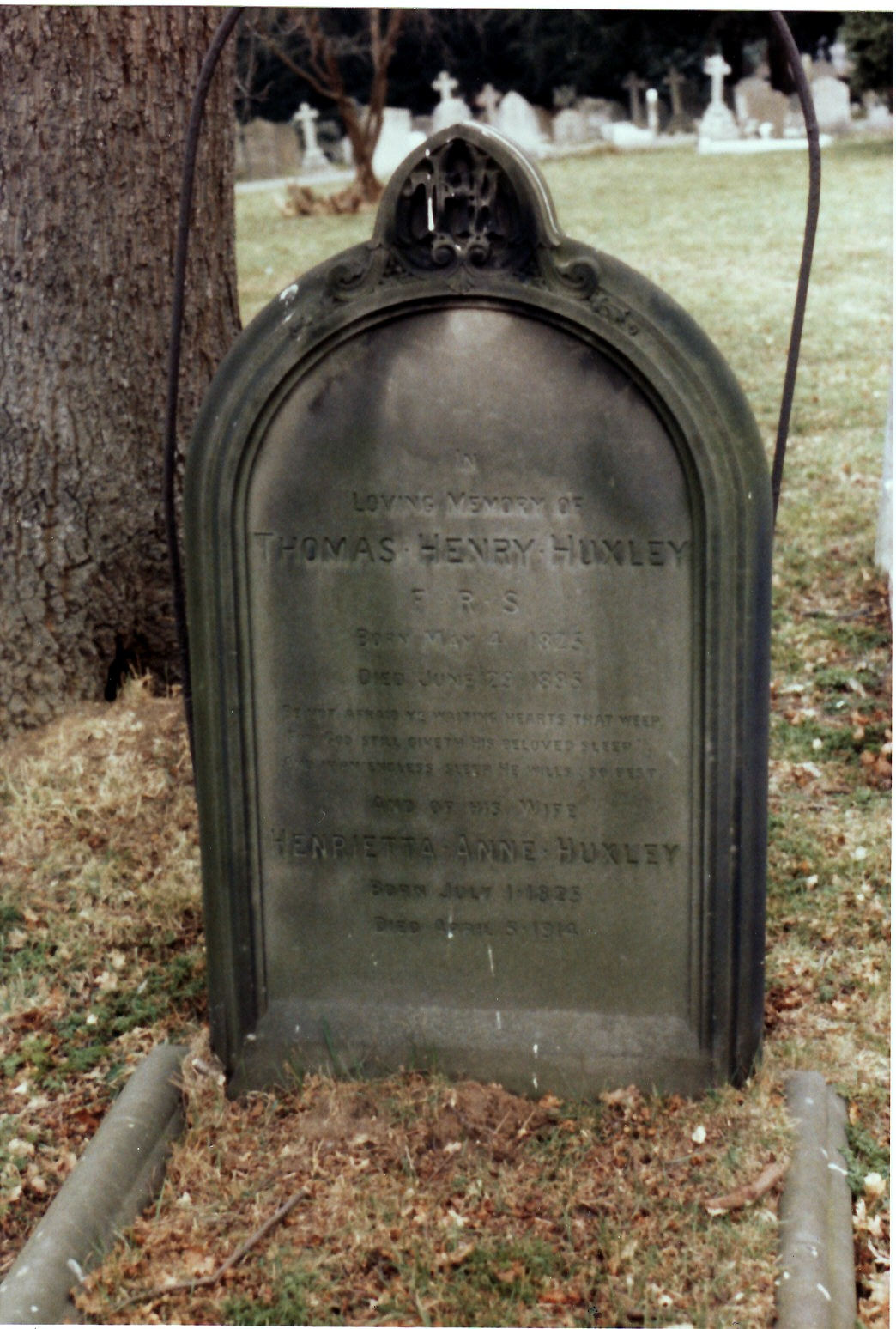
Huxley's grave in East Finchley Cemetery in North London

=== Family ===
Huxley and his wife had five daughters and three sons:

- Noel Huxley (1856–1860), died aged 3.
- Jessie Oriana Huxley (1856–1927), married architect Fred Waller in 1877.
- Marian Huxley (1859–1887), married artist John Collier in 1879.
- Leonard Huxley (1860–1933), married Julia Arnold.
- Rachel Huxley (1862–1934), married twice. Firstly civil engineer Alfred Eckersley in 1884; secondly Harold Shawcross in 1894.
- Henrietta (Nettie) Huxley (1863–1940), married Harold Roller, travelled Europe as a singer.
- Henry Huxley (1865–1946), became a fashionable general practitioner in London.
- Ethel Huxley (1866–1941) married artist John Collier (widower of sister) in 1889.

=== Public duties and awards ===
From 1870 onwards, Huxley was to some extent drawn away from scientific research by the claims of public duty. He served on eight Royal Commissions, from 1862 to 1884. From 1871 to 1880 he was a Secretary of the Royal Society and from 1883 to 1885 he was president. He was president of the Geological Society from 1868 to 1870. In 1870, he was president of the British Association at Liverpool and, in the same year was elected a member of the newly constituted London School Board. He was president of the Quekett Microscopical Club from 1877 to 1879. He was the leading person amongst those who reformed the Royal Society, persuaded government about science, and established scientific education in British schools and universities.

He was awarded the highest honours then open to British men of science. The Royal Society, who had elected him as Fellow when he was 25 (1851), awarded him the Royal Medal the next year (1852), a year before Charles Darwin got the same award. He was the youngest biologist to receive such recognition. He was elected to Honorary membership of the Manchester Literary and Philosophical Society in 1872. Then later in life he received the Copley Medal in 1888 and the Darwin Medal in 1894; the Geological Society awarded him the Wollaston Medal in 1876; the Linnean Society awarded him the Linnean Medal in 1890. There were many other elections and appointments to eminent scientific bodies; these and his many academic awards are listed in the Life and Letters. He turned down many other appointments, notably the Linacre chair in zoology at Oxford and the Mastership of University College, Oxford.

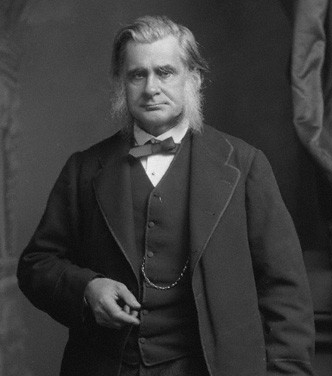
Huxley by Alexander Bassano c. 1883

In 1873 the King of Sweden made Huxley, Hooker and Tyndall Knights of the Order of the Polar Star: they could wear the insignia but not use the title in Britain. Huxley collected many honorary memberships of foreign societies, academic awards and honorary doctorates from Britain and Germany. He also became a foreign member of the Royal Netherlands Academy of Arts and Sciences in 1892. In 1916 a street in the Bronx, New York City, was named in his honour (Huxley Avenue).

As recognition of his many public services, he was appointed Privy Councillor in 1892.

Despite his many achievements, he was given no award by the British state until late in life. In this, he did better than Darwin, who got no award of any kind from the state. (Darwin's proposed knighthood was vetoed by ecclesiastical advisers, including Wilberforce.) Perhaps Huxley had commented too often on his dislike of honours, or perhaps his many assaults on the traditional beliefs of organised religion made enemies in the establishment – he had vigorous debates in print with Benjamin Disraeli, William Ewart Gladstone, and Arthur Balfour, and his relationship with Lord Salisbury was less than tranquil.

Huxley was for about thirty years evolution's most effective advocate, and for some Huxley was "the premier advocate of science in the nineteenth century [for] the whole English-speaking world".

Though he had many admirers and disciples, his retirement and later death left British zoology somewhat bereft of leadership. He had, directly or indirectly, guided the careers and appointments of the next generation. Huxley thought he was "the only man who can carry out my work": The deaths of Balfour and William Kingdon Clifford were "the greatest losses to science in our time".

=== Vertebrate palaeontology ===
The first half of Huxley's career as a palaeontologist is marked by a rather strange predilection for 'persistent types', in which he seemed to argue that evolutionary advancement (in the sense of major new groups of animals and plants) was rare or absent in the Phanerozoic. In the same vein, he tended to push the origin of major groups such as birds and mammals back into the Palaeozoic era, and to claim that no order of plants had ever gone extinct.

Much paper has been consumed by historians of science ruminating on this strange and somewhat unclear idea. Huxley was wrong to pitch the loss of orders in the Phanerozoic as low as 7%, and he did not estimate the number of new orders which evolved. Persistent types sat rather uncomfortably next to Darwin's more fluid ideas; despite his intelligence, it took Huxley a surprisingly long time to appreciate some of the implications of evolution. However, gradually Huxley moved away from this conservative style of thinking as his understanding of palaeontology, and the discipline itself, developed.

Huxley's detailed anatomical work was, as always, first-rate and productive. His work on fossil fish shows his distinctive approach: Whereas pre-Darwinian naturalists collected, identified, and classified, Huxley worked mainly to reveal the evolutionary relationships between groups.

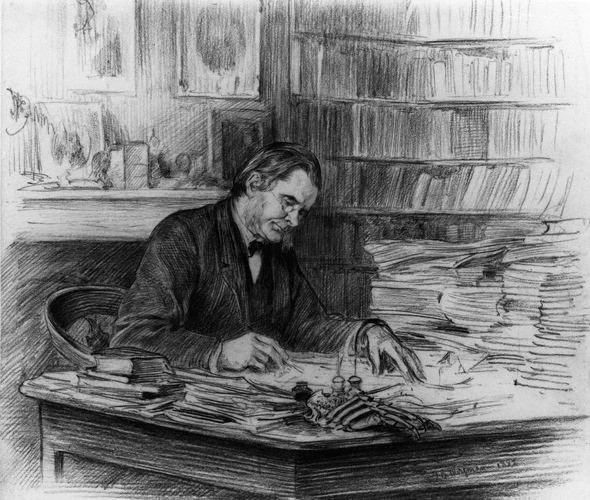
Huxley by Wirgman a drawing in pencil (1882)

The lobe-finned fish (such as coelacanths and lungfish) have paired appendages whose internal skeleton is attached to the shoulder or pelvis by a single bone, the humerus or femur. His interest in these fish brought him close to the origin of tetrapods, one of the most important areas of vertebrate palaeontology.

The study of fossil reptiles led to his demonstrating the fundamental affinity of birds and reptiles, which he united under the title of Sauropsida. His papers on Archaeopteryx and the origin of birds were of great interest then and still are.

Apart from his interest in persuading the world that man was a primate and had descended from the same stock as the apes, Huxley did little work on mammals, with one exception. On his tour of America Huxley was shown the remarkable series of fossil horses, discovered by Othniel Charles Marsh, in Yale University's Peabody Museum. An Easterner, Marsh was America's first professor of palaeontology, but also one who had come west into hostile Indian territory in search of fossils, hunted buffalo, and met Red Cloud (in 1874). Funded by his uncle George Peabody, Marsh had made some remarkable discoveries: the huge Cretaceous aquatic bird Hesperornis, and the dinosaur footprints along the Connecticut River were worth the trip by themselves, but the horse fossils were really special. After a week with Marsh and his fossils, Huxley wrote excitedly, "The collection of fossils is the most wonderful thing I ever saw."

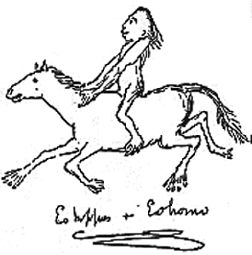
Huxley's sketch of then hypothetical five-toed Eohippus being ridden by "Eohomo"

The collection at that time went from the small four-toed forest-dwelling Orohippus from the Eocene through three-toed species such as Miohippus to species more like the modern horse. By looking at their teeth he could see that, as the size grew larger and the toes reduced, the teeth changed from those of a browser to those of a grazer. All such changes could be explained by a general alteration in habitat from forest to grassland. And, it is now known, that is what did happen over large areas of North America from the Eocene to the Pleistocene: The ultimate causative agent was global temperature reduction (see Paleocene–Eocene Thermal Maximum). The modern account of the evolution of the horse has many other members, and the overall appearance of the tree of descent is more like a bush than a straight line.

The horse series also strongly suggested that the process was gradual, and that the origin of the modern horse lay in North America, not in Eurasia. If so, then something must have happened to horses in North America, since none were there when Europeans arrived. The experience with Marsh was enough for Huxley to give credence to Darwin's gradualism, and to introduce the story of the horse into his lecture series.

Marsh's and Huxley's conclusions were initially quite different. However, Marsh carefully showed Huxley his complete sequence of fossils. As Marsh put it, Huxley "then informed me that all this was new to him and that my facts demonstrated the evolution of the horse beyond question, and for the first time indicated the direct line of descent of an existing animal. With the generosity of true greatness, he gave up his own opinions in the face of new truth, and took my conclusions as the basis of his famous New York lecture on the horse."

== Support of Darwin ==
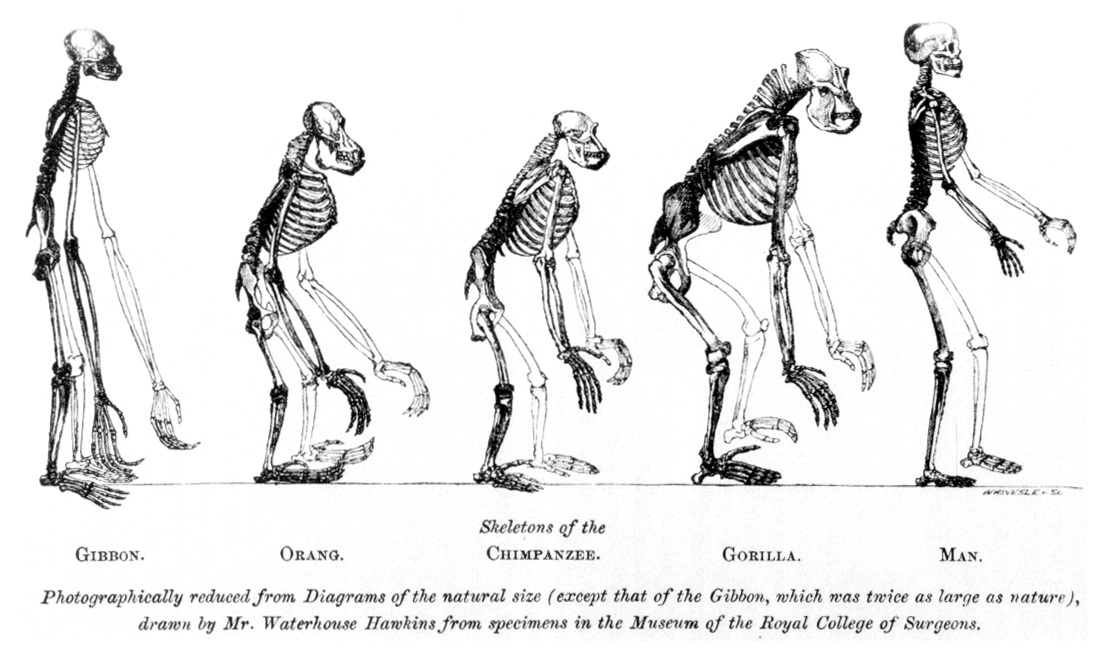
The frontispiece to Huxley's Evidence as to Man's Place in Nature (1863) compares ape and human skeletons. The gibbon (left) is double size.

Huxley was originally not persuaded by "development theory", as evolution was once called. This can be seen in his savage review of Robert Chambers' Vestiges of the Natural History of Creation, an 1844 book which contained some quite pertinent arguments in favour of evolution. Huxley had also rejected Jean-Baptiste Lamarck's theory of transmutation, on the basis that there was insufficient evidence to support it. All this scepticism was brought together in a lecture to the Royal Institution, which made Darwin anxious enough to set about an effort to change young Huxley's mind. It was the kind of thing Darwin did with his closest scientific friends, but he must have had some particular intuition about Huxley, who was by all accounts a most impressive person even as a young man.

Huxley was therefore one of the small group who knew about Darwin's ideas before they were published (the group included Joseph Dalton Hooker and Charles Lyell). The first publication by Darwin of his ideas came when Wallace sent Darwin his famous paper on natural selection, which was presented by Lyell and Hooker to the Linnean Society in 1858 alongside excerpts from Darwin's notebook and a Darwin letter to Asa Gray. Huxley's famous response to the idea of natural selection was "How extremely stupid not to have thought of that!" However, he never conclusively made up his mind about whether natural selection was the main method for evolution, though he did admit it was a hypothesis which was a good working basis.

Logically speaking, the prior question was whether evolution had taken place at all. It is to this question that much of Darwin's On the Origin of Species was devoted. Its publication in 1859 completely convinced Huxley of evolution and it was this and no doubt his admiration of Darwin's way of amassing and using evidence that formed the basis of his support for Darwin in the debates that followed the book's publication.

Huxley's support started with his anonymous favourable review of the Origin in the Times for 26 December 1859, and continued with articles in several periodicals, and in a lecture at the Royal Institution in February 1860. At the same time, Richard Owen, whilst writing an extremely hostile anonymous review of the Origin in the Edinburgh Review, also primed Samuel Wilberforce who wrote one in the Quarterly Review, running to 17,000 words. The authorship of this latter review was not known for sure until Wilberforce's son wrote his biography. So it can be said that, just as Darwin groomed Huxley, so Owen groomed Wilberforce; and both the proxies fought public battles on behalf of their principals as much as themselves. Though we do not know the exact words of the Oxford debate, we do know what Huxley thought of the review in the Quarterly:

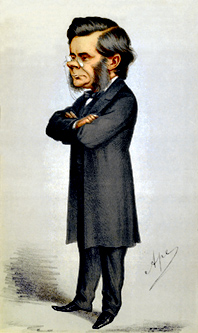
Caricature of Huxley by Carlo Pellegrini in Vanity Fair, 1871

Since Lord Brougham assailed Dr Young, the world has seen no such specimen of the insolence of a shallow pretender to a Master in Science as this remarkable production, in which one of the most exact of observers, most cautious of reasoners, and most candid of expositors, of this or any other age, is held up to scorn as a "flighty" person, who endeavours "to prop up his utterly rotten fabric of guess and speculation," and whose "mode of dealing with nature" is reprobated as "utterly dishonourable to Natural Science."

If I confine my retrospect of the reception of the Origin of Species to a twelvemonth, or thereabouts, from the time of its publication, I do not recollect anything quite so foolish and unmannerly as the Quarterly Review article...

Since his death, Huxley has become known as "Darwin's Bulldog", taken to refer to his pluck and courage in debate, and to his perceived role in protecting the older man. The sobriquet appears to be Huxley's own invention, although of unknown date, and it was not current in his lifetime.

While the second half of Darwin's life was lived mainly within his family, the younger and combative Huxley operated mainly out in the world at large. A letter from Huxley to Ernst Haeckel (2 November 1871) states: "The dogs have been snapping at [Darwin's] heels too much of late."

=== Debate with Wilberforce ===
Famously, Huxley responded to Wilberforce in the debate at the British Association meeting, on Saturday 30 June 1860 at the Oxford University Museum. Huxley's presence there had been encouraged on the previous evening when he met Robert Chambers, the Scottish publisher and author of Vestiges, who was walking the streets of Oxford in a dispirited state, and begged for assistance. The debate followed the presentation of a paper by John William Draper, and was chaired by Darwin's former botany tutor John Stevens Henslow. Darwin's theory was opposed by the Bishop of Oxford, Samuel Wilberforce, and those supporting Darwin included Huxley and their mutual friends Hooker and John Lubbock. The platform featured Sir Benjamin Brodie and Professor Beale, and Robert FitzRoy, who had been captain of HMS Beagle during Darwin's voyage, spoke against Darwin.

Wilberforce had a track record against evolution as far back as the previous Oxford B.A. meeting in 1847 when he attacked Chambers' Vestiges. For the more challenging task of opposing the Origin, and the implication that man descended from apes, he had been assiduously coached by Richard Owen—Owen stayed with him the night before the debate. On the day, Wilberforce repeated some of the arguments from his Quarterly Review article (written but not yet published), then ventured onto slippery ground. His famous jibe at Huxley (as to whether Huxley was descended from an ape on his mother's side or his father's side) was probably unplanned, and certainly unwise. Huxley's reply to the effect that he would rather be descended from an ape than a man who misused his great talents to suppress debate—the exact wording is not certain—was widely recounted in pamphlets and a spoof play.

The letters of Alfred Newton include one to his brother giving an eyewitness account of the debate, and written less than a month afterwards. Other eyewitnesses, with one or two exceptions (Hooker especially thought he had made the best points), give similar accounts, at varying dates after the event. The general view was and still is that Huxley got much the better of the exchange, though Wilberforce himself thought he had done quite well. In the absence of a verbatim report, differing perceptions are difficult to judge fairly; Huxley wrote a detailed account for Darwin, a letter which does not survive; however, a letter to his friend Frederick Daniel Dyster does survive with an account just three months after the event.

One effect of the debate was to hugely increase Huxley's visibility amongst educated people, through the accounts in newspapers and periodicals. Another consequence was to alert him to the importance of public debate: a lesson he never forgot. A third effect was to serve notice that Darwinian ideas could not be easily dismissed: on the contrary, they would be vigorously defended against orthodox authority. A fourth effect was to promote professionalism in science, with its implied need for scientific education. A fifth consequence was indirect: as Wilberforce had feared, a defence of evolution did undermine literal belief in the Old Testament, especially the Book of Genesis. Many of the liberal clergy at the meeting were quite pleased with the outcome of the debate; they were supporters, perhaps, of the controversial Essays and Reviews. Thus, both on the side of science and on that of religion, the debate was important and its outcome significant. (see also below)

Huxley and Wilberforce remained on courteous terms after the debate (and able to work together on projects such as the Metropolitan Board of Education), whereas Huxley and Owen were never reconciled.

=== Man's place in nature ===
For nearly a decade his work was directed mainly to the relationship of man to the apes. This led him directly into a clash with Richard Owen, a man widely disliked for his behaviour whilst also being admired for his capability. The struggle was to culminate in some severe defeats for Owen. Huxley's Croonian Lecture, delivered before the Royal Society in 1858 on The Theory of the Vertebrate Skull was the start. In this, he rejected Owen's theory that the bones of the skull and the spine were homologous, an opinion previously held by Johann Wolfgang von Goethe and Lorenz Oken.

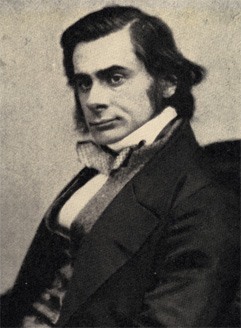
Huxley at 32

From 1860 to 1863 Huxley developed his ideas, presenting them in lectures to working men, students and the general public, followed by publication. Also in 1862 a series of talks to working men was printed lecture by lecture as pamphlets, later bound up as a little green book; the first copies went on sale in December. Other lectures grew into Huxley's most famous work Evidence as to Man's place in Nature (1863) where he addressed the key issues long before Charles Darwin published his Descent of Man in 1871.

Although Darwin did not publish his Descent of Man until 1871, the general debate on this topic had started years before (there was even a precursor debate in the 18th century between James Burnett, Lord Monboddo, and Georges-Louis Leclerc). Darwin had dropped a hint when, in the conclusion to the Origin, he wrote: "In the distant future... light will be thrown on the origin of man and his history". Not so distant, as it turned out. A key event had already occurred in 1857 when Richard Owen presented (to the Linnean Society) his theory that man was marked off from all other mammals by possessing features of the brain peculiar to the genus Homo. Having reached this opinion, Owen separated man from all other mammals in a subclass of its own. No other biologist held such an extreme view. Darwin reacted "Man...as distinct from a chimpanzee [as] an ape from a platypus... I cannot swallow that!" Neither could Huxley, who was able to demonstrate that Owen's idea was completely wrong.

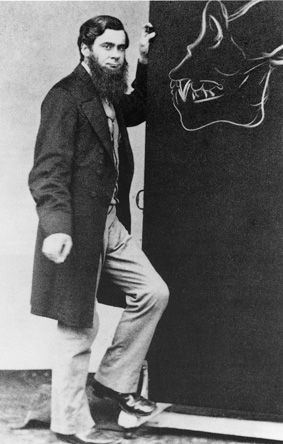
Huxley c.1870; sketch is a gorilla skull

The subject was raised at the 1860 BA Oxford meeting, when Huxley flatly contradicted Owen, and promised a later demonstration of the facts. In fact, a number of demonstrations were held in London and the provinces. In 1862 at the Cambridge meeting of the B.A. Huxley's friend William Flower gave a public dissection to show that the same structures (the posterior horn of the lateral ventricle and hippocampus minor) were indeed present in apes. The debate was widely publicised, and parodied as the Great Hippocampus Question. It was seen as one of Owen's greatest blunders, revealing Huxley as not only dangerous in debate but also a better anatomist.

Owen conceded that there was something that could be called a hippocampus minor in the apes, but stated that it was much less developed and that such a presence did not detract from the overall distinction of simple brain size.

Huxley's ideas on this topic were summed up in January 1861 in the first issue (new series) of his own journal, the Natural History Review: "the most violent scientific paper he had ever composed". This paper was reprinted in 1863 as chapter 2 of Man's Place in Nature, with an addendum giving his account of the Owen/Huxley controversy about the ape brain. In his Collected Essays this addendum was removed.

The extended argument on the ape brain, partly in debate and partly in print, backed by dissections and demonstrations, was a landmark in Huxley's career. It was highly important in asserting his dominance of comparative anatomy, and in the long run more influential in establishing evolution amongst biologists than was the debate with Wilberforce. It also marked the start of Owen's decline in the esteem of his fellow biologists.

The following was written by Huxley to George Rolleston before the BA meeting in 1861:

"My dear Rolleston... The obstinate reiteration of erroneous assertions can only be nullified by as persistent an appeal to facts; and I greatly regret that my engagements do not permit me to be present at the British Association in order to assist personally at what, I believe, will be the seventh public demonstration during the past twelve months of the untruth of the three assertions, that the posterior lobe of the cerebrum, the posterior cornu of the lateral ventricle, and the hippocampus minor, are peculiar to man and do not exist in the apes. I shall be obliged if you will read this letter to the Section" Yours faithfully, Thos. H. Huxley.

During those years there was also work on human fossil anatomy and anthropology. In 1862 he examined the Neanderthal skull-cap, which had been discovered in 1857. It was the first pre-sapiens discovery of a fossil man, and it was immediately clear to him that the brain case was surprisingly large. Huxley also started to dabble in physical anthropology, and classified the human races into nine categories, along with placing them under four general categorisations as Australoid, Negroid, Xanthochroic and Mongoloid. Such classifications depended mainly on physical appearance and certain anatomical characteristics.

=== Natural selection ===
Huxley was certainly not slavish in his dealings with Darwin. As shown in every biography, they had quite different and rather complementary characters. Important also, Darwin was a field naturalist, but Huxley was an anatomist, so there was a difference in their experience of nature. Lastly, Darwin's views on science were different from Huxley's views. For Darwin, natural selection was the best way to explain evolution because it explained a huge range of natural history facts and observations: it solved problems. Huxley, on the other hand, was an empiricist who trusted what he could see, and some things were not easily seen. With this in mind, one can appreciate the debate between them, Darwin writing his letters, Huxley never going quite so far as to say he thought Darwin was right.

Huxley's reservations on natural selection were of the type "until selection and breeding can be seen to give rise to varieties which are infertile with each other, natural selection cannot be proved". Huxley's position on selection was agnostic; yet he gave no credence to any other theory. Despite this concern about evidence, Huxley saw that if evolution came about through variation, reproduction and selection then other things would also be subject to the same pressures. This included ideas because they are invented, imitated and selected by humans: ‘The struggle for existence holds as much in the intellectual as in the physical world. A theory is a species of thinking, and its right to exist is coextensive with its power of resisting extinction by its rivals.’ This is the same idea as meme theory put forward by Richard Dawkins in 1976.

Darwin's part in the discussion came mostly in letters, as was his wont, along the lines: "The empirical evidence you call for is both impossible in practical terms, and in any event unnecessary. It's the same as asking to see every step in the transformation (or the splitting) of one species into another. My way so many issues are clarified and problems solved; no other theory does nearly so well".

Huxley's reservation, as Helena Cronin has so aptly remarked, was contagious: "it spread itself for years among all kinds of doubters of Darwinism". One reason for this doubt was that comparative anatomy could address the question of descent, but not the question of mechanism.

=== Pallbearer ===
Huxley was a pallbearer at the funeral of Charles Darwin on 26 April 1882.

== The X Club ==
In November 1864, Huxley succeeded in launching a dining club, the X Club, composed of like-minded people working to advance the cause of science; not surprisingly, the club consisted of most of his closest friends. There were nine members, who decided at their first meeting that there should be no more. The members were: Huxley, John Tyndall, J. D. Hooker, John Lubbock (banker, biologist and neighbour of Darwin), Herbert Spencer (social philosopher and sub-editor of the Economist), William Spottiswoode (mathematician and the Queen's Printer), Thomas Hirst (Professor of Physics at University College London), Edward Frankland (the new Professor of Chemistry at the Royal Institution) and George Busk, zoologist and palaeontologist (formerly surgeon for HMS Dreadnought). All except Spencer were fellows of the Royal Society. Tyndall was a particularly close friend; for many years they met regularly and discussed issues of the day. On more than one occasion Huxley joined Tyndall in the latter's trips into the Alps and helped with his investigations in glaciology.

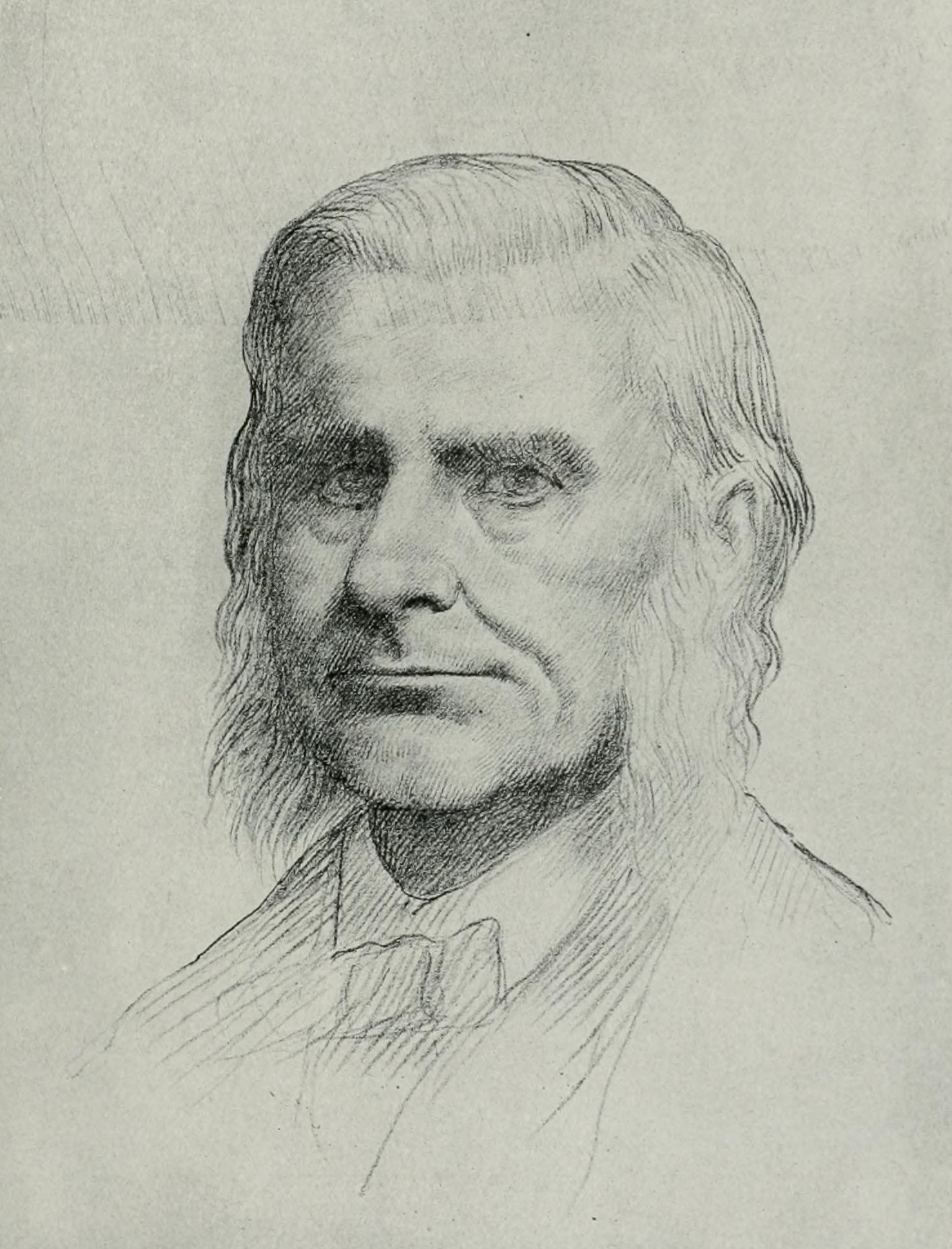
From the portrait of A. Legros

There were also some quite significant X-Club satellites such as William Flower and George Rolleston, (Huxley protegés), and liberal clergyman Arthur Stanley, the Dean of Westminster. Guests such as Charles Darwin and Hermann von Helmholtz were entertained from time to time.

They would dine early on first Thursdays at a hotel, planning what to do; high on the agenda was to change the way the Royal Society Council did business. It was no coincidence that the Council met later that same evening. The first item for the Xs was to get the Copley Medal for Darwin, which they managed after quite a struggle.

The next step was to acquire a journal to spread their ideas. This was the weekly Reader, which they bought, revamped and redirected. Huxley had already become part-owner of the Natural History Review bolstered by the support of Lubbock, Rolleston, Busk and Carpenter (X-clubbers and satellites). The journal was switched to pro-Darwinian lines and relaunched in January 1861. After a stream of good articles the NHR failed after four years; but it had helped at a critical time for the establishment of evolution. The Reader also failed, despite its broader appeal which included art and literature as well as science. The periodical market was quite crowded at the time, but most probably the critical factor was Huxley's time; he was simply over-committed, and could not afford to hire full-time editors. This occurred often in his life: Huxley took on too many ventures, and was not as astute as Darwin at getting others to do work for him.

However, the experience gained with the Reader was put to good use when the X Club put their weight behind the founding of Nature in 1869. This time no mistakes were made: above all, there was a permanent editor (though not full-time), Norman Lockyer, who served until 1919, a year before his death. In 1925, to celebrate his centenary, Nature issued a supplement devoted to Huxley.

The peak of the X Club's influence was from 1873 to 1885 as Hooker, Spottiswoode and Huxley were presidents of the Royal Society in succession. Spencer resigned in 1889 after a dispute with Huxley over state support for science. After 1892 it was just an excuse for the surviving members to meet. Hooker died in 1911, and Lubbock (now Lord Avebury) was the last surviving member.

Huxley was also an active member of the Metaphysical Society, which ran from 1869 to 1880. It was formed around a nucleus of clergy and expanded to include all kinds of opinions. Tyndall and Huxley later joined The Club (founded by Samuel Johnson) when they could be sure that Owen would not turn up.

== Educational influence ==
When Huxley himself was young there were virtually no degrees in British universities in the biological sciences and few courses. Most biologists of his day either were self-taught or took medical degrees. When he retired there were established chairs in biological disciplines in most universities, and a broad consensus on the curricula to be followed. Huxley was the single most influential person in this transformation.

=== School of Mines and Zoology ===
In the early 1870s, the Royal School of Mines moved to new quarters in South Kensington; ultimately it would become one of the constituent parts of Imperial College London. The move gave Huxley the chance to give more prominence to laboratory work in biology teaching, an idea suggested by practice in German universities. In the main, the method was based on the use of carefully chosen types, and depended on the dissection of anatomy, supplemented by microscopy, museum specimens and some elementary physiology at the hands of Foster.

The typical day would start with Huxley lecturing at 9 am, followed by a program of laboratory work supervised by his demonstrators. Huxley's demonstrators were picked men—all became leaders of biology in Britain in later life, spreading Huxley's ideas as well as their own. Michael Foster became Professor of Physiology at Cambridge; Ray Lankester became Jodrell Professor of Zoology at University College London (1875–91), Professor of Comparative Anatomy at Oxford (1891–98) and Director of the Natural History Museum (1898–1907); S.H. Vines became Professor of Botany at Cambridge; W.T. Thiselton-Dyer became Hooker's successor at Kew (he was already Hooker's son-in-law!); T. Jeffery Parker became Professor of Zoology and Comparative Anatomy at University College, Cardiff; and William Rutherford became the Professor of Physiology at Edinburgh. William Flower, Conservator to the Hunterian Museum, and THH's assistant in many dissections, became Sir William Flower, Hunterian Professor of Comparative Anatomy and, later, Director of the Natural History Museum. It's a remarkable list of disciples, especially when contrasted with Owen who, in a longer professional life than Huxley, left no disciples at all. Darwin said "No one fact tells so strongly against Owen... as that he has never reared one pupil or follower."

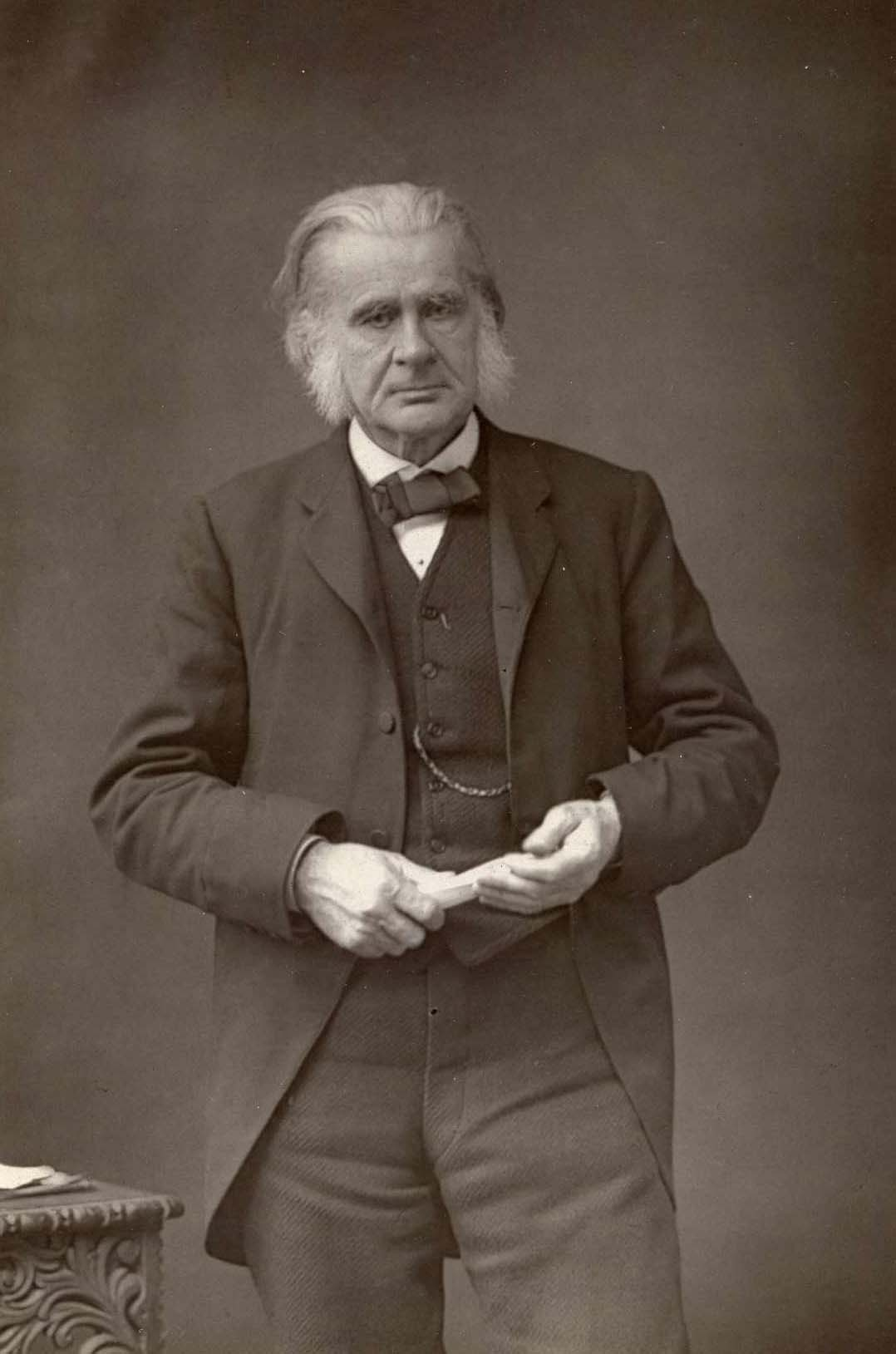
Photograph of Huxley (c. 1890)

Huxley's courses for students were so much narrower than the man himself that many were bewildered by the contrast: "The teaching of zoology by use of selected animal types has come in for much criticism"; Looking back in 1914 to his time as a student, Sir Arthur Shipley said "Darwin's later works all dealt with living organisms, yet our obsession was with the dead, with bodies preserved, and cut into the most refined slices." E.W MacBride said "Huxley... would persist in looking at animals as material structures and not as living, active beings; in a word... he was a necrologist." To put it simply, Huxley preferred to teach what he had actually seen with his own eyes.

This largely morphological program of comparative anatomy remained at the core of most biological education for a hundred years until the advent of cell and molecular biology and interest in evolutionary ecology forced a fundamental rethink. It is an interesting fact that the methods of the field naturalists who led the way in developing the theory of evolution (Darwin, Alfred Russel Wallace, Fritz Müller, Henry Bates) were scarcely represented at all in Huxley's program. Ecological investigation of life in its environment was virtually non-existent, and theory, evolutionary or otherwise, was at a discount. Michael Ruse finds no mention of evolution or Darwinism in any of the exams set by Huxley, and confirms the lecture content based on two complete sets of lecture notes.

Since Darwin, Wallace and Bates did not hold teaching posts at any stage of their adult careers (and Műller never returned from Brazil) the imbalance in Huxley's program went uncorrected. It is surely strange that Huxley's courses did not contain an account of the evidence collected by those naturalists of life in the tropics; evidence which they had found so convincing, and which caused their views on evolution by natural selection to be so similar. Adrian Desmond suggests that "[biology] had to be simple, synthetic and assimilable [because] it was to train teachers and had no other heuristic function". That must be part of the reason; indeed it does help to explain the stultifying nature of much school biology. But zoology as taught at all levels became far too much the product of one man.

Huxley was comfortable with comparative anatomy, at which he was the greatest master of the day. He was not an all-round naturalist like Darwin, who had shown clearly enough how to weave together detailed factual information and subtle arguments across the vast web of life. Huxley chose, in his teaching (and to some extent in his research) to take a more straightforward course, concentrating on his personal strengths.

=== Schools and the Bible ===
Huxley was also a major influence in the direction taken by British schools: in November 1870, he was elected to the London School Board in its first elections. In primary schooling, he advocated a wide range of disciplines, similar to what is taught today: reading, writing, arithmetic, art, science, music, etc. In secondary education he recommended two years of basic liberal studies followed by two years of some upper-division work, focusing on a more specific area of study. A practical example of the latter is his famous 1868 lecture On a Piece of Chalk which was first published as an essay in Macmillan's Magazine in London later that year. The piece reconstructs the geological history of Britain from a simple piece of chalk and demonstrates science as "organized common sense".

Huxley supported the reading of the Bible in schools. This may seem out of step with his agnostic convictions, but he believed that the Bible's significant moral teachings and superb use of language were relevant to English life. "I do not advocate burning your ship to get rid of the cockroaches". However, what Huxley proposed was to create an edited version of the Bible, shorn of "shortcomings and errors... statements to which men of science absolutely and entirely demur... These tender children [should] not be taught that which you do not yourselves believe". The Board voted against his idea, but it also voted against the idea that public money should be used to support students attending church schools. Vigorous debates took place on such points, and the debates were minuted in detail. Huxley said "I will never be a party to enabling the State to sweep the children of this country into denominational schools". The Act of Parliament which founded board schools permitted the reading of the Bible but did not permit any denominational doctrine to be taught.

It may be right to see Huxley's life and work as contributing to the secularisation of British society which gradually occurred over the following century. Ernst Mayr said "It can hardly be doubted that [biology] has helped to undermine traditional beliefs and value systems"—and Huxley more than anyone else was responsible for this trend in Britain. Some modern Christian apologists consider Huxley the father of antitheism, though he himself maintained that he was an agnostic, not an atheist. He was, however, a lifelong and determined opponent of almost all organised religion throughout his life, especially the "Roman Church ... carefully calculated for the destruction of all that is highest in the moral nature, in the intellectual freedom, and in the political freedom of mankind". In the same line of thought, in an article in Popular Science, Huxley used the expression "the so-called Christianity of Catholicism", explaining: "I say 'so-called' not by way of offence, but as a protest against the monstrous assumption that Catholic Christianity is explicitly or implicitly contained in any trust-worthy record of the teaching of Jesus of Nazareth."

Originally coining the term in 1869, Huxley elaborated on "agnosticism" in 1889 to frame the nature of claims in terms of what is knowable and what is not. Huxley states

Agnosticism, in fact, is not a creed, but a method, the essence of which lies in the rigorous application of a single principle... the fundamental axiom of modern science... In matters of the intellect, follow your reason as far as it will take you, without regard to any other consideration... In matters of the intellect, do not pretend that conclusions are certain which are not demonstrated or demonstrable.

Use of that term has continued to the present day (see Thomas Henry Huxley and agnosticism). Much of Huxley's agnosticism is influenced by Kantian views on human perception and the ability to rely on rational evidence rather than belief systems.

In 1893, during preparation for the second Romanes Lecture, Huxley expressed his disappointment at the shortcomings of 'liberal' theology, describing its doctrines as 'popular illusions', and the teachings they replaced 'faulty as they are, appear to me to be vastly nearer the truth'.

Vladimir Lenin remarked that for Huxley "agnosticism serves as a fig-leaf for materialism". (See also the Debate with Wilberforce above.)

=== Adult education ===
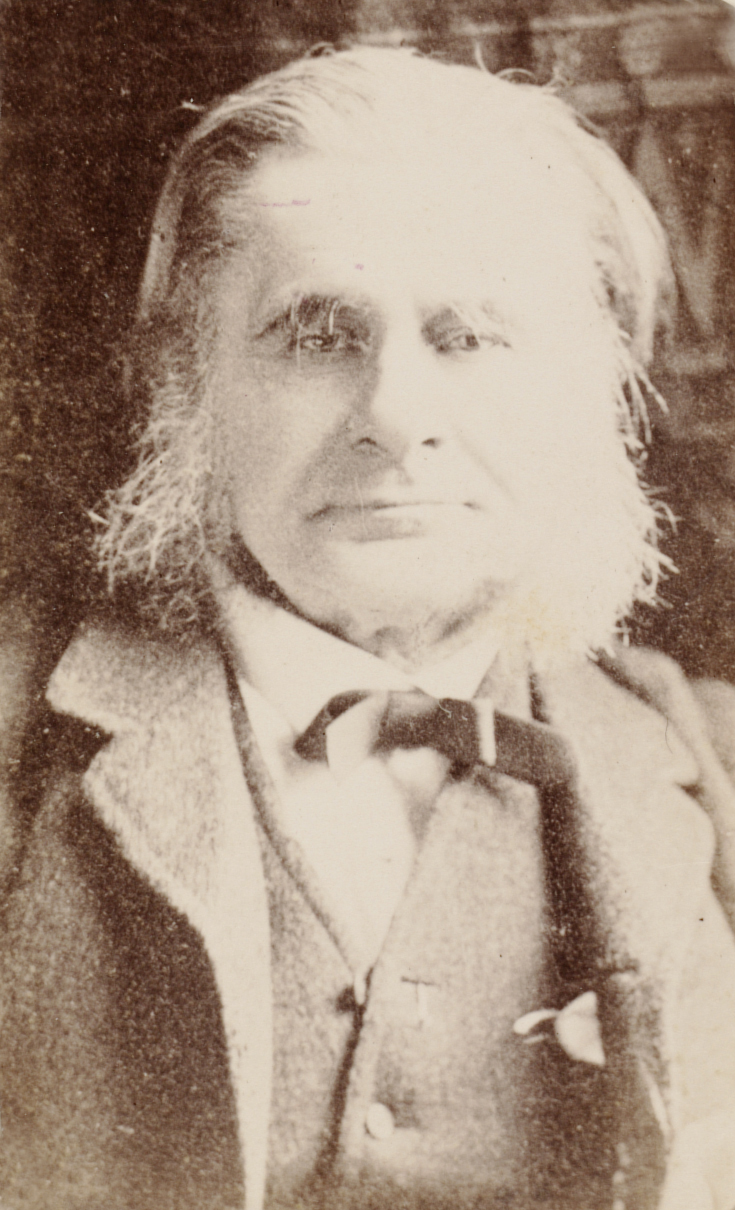
Thomas Henry Huxley, c. 1885, from a carte de visite

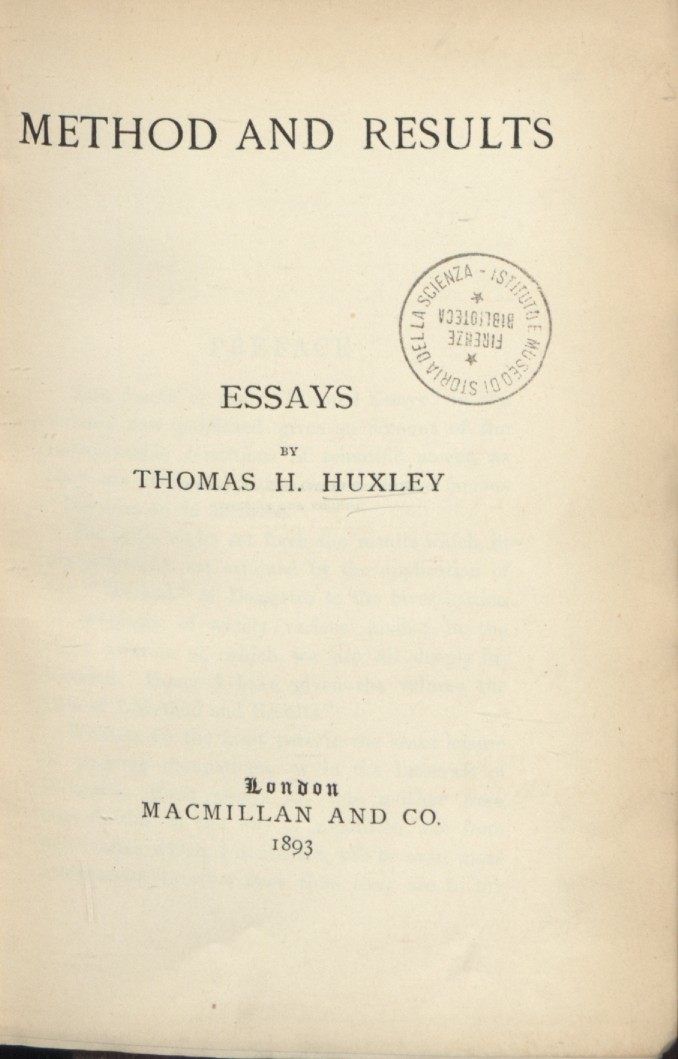
Method and results, 1893

Huxley's interest in education went still further than school and university classrooms; he made a great effort to reach interested adults of all kinds: after all, he himself was largely self-educated. There were his lecture courses for working men, many of which were published afterwards, and there was the use he made of journalism, partly to earn money but mostly to reach out to the literate public. For most of his adult life, he wrote for periodicals—the Westminster Review, the Saturday Review, the Reader, the Pall Mall Gazette, Macmillan's Magazine, the Contemporary Review. Germany was still ahead in formal science education, but interested people in Victorian Britain could use their initiative and find out what was going on by reading periodicals and using the lending libraries.

In 1868 Huxley became Principal of the South London Working Men's College in Blackfriars Road. The moving spirit was a portmanteau worker, Wm. Rossiter, who did most of the work; the funds were put up mainly by F.D. Maurice's Christian Socialists. At sixpence for a course and a penny for a lecture by Huxley, this was some bargain; and so was the free library organised by the college, an idea which was widely copied. Huxley thought, and said, that the men who attended were as good as any country squire.

The technique of printing his more popular lectures in periodicals which were sold to the general public was extremely effective. A good example was "The Physical Basis of Life", a lecture given in Edinburgh on 8 November 1868. Its theme—that vital action is nothing more than "the result of the molecular forces of the protoplasm which displays it"—shocked the audience, though that was nothing compared to the uproar when it was published in the Fortnightly Review for February 1869. John Morley, the editor, said "No article that had appeared in any periodical for a generation had caused such a sensation". The issue was reprinted seven times and protoplasm became a household word; Punch added 'Professor Protoplasm' to his other soubriquets.

The topic had been stimulated by Huxley seeing the cytoplasmic streaming in plant cells, which is indeed a sensational sight. For these audiences, Huxley's claim that this activity should not be explained by words such as vitality, but by the working of its constituent chemicals, was surprising and shocking. Today we would perhaps emphasise the extraordinary structural arrangement of those chemicals as the key to understanding what cells do, but little of that was known in the nineteenth century.

When the Archbishop of York thought this 'new philosophy' was based on Auguste Comte's positivism, Huxley corrected him: "Comte's philosophy [is just] Catholicism minus Christianity" (Huxley 1893 vol 1 of Collected Essays Methods & Results 156). A later version was "[positivism is] sheer Popery with M. Comte in the chair of St Peter, and with the names of the saints changed". (lecture on The scientific aspects of positivism Huxley 1870 Lay Sermons, Addresses and Reviews p. 149). Huxley's dismissal of positivism damaged it so severely that Comte's ideas withered in Britain.

== Huxley and the humanities ==
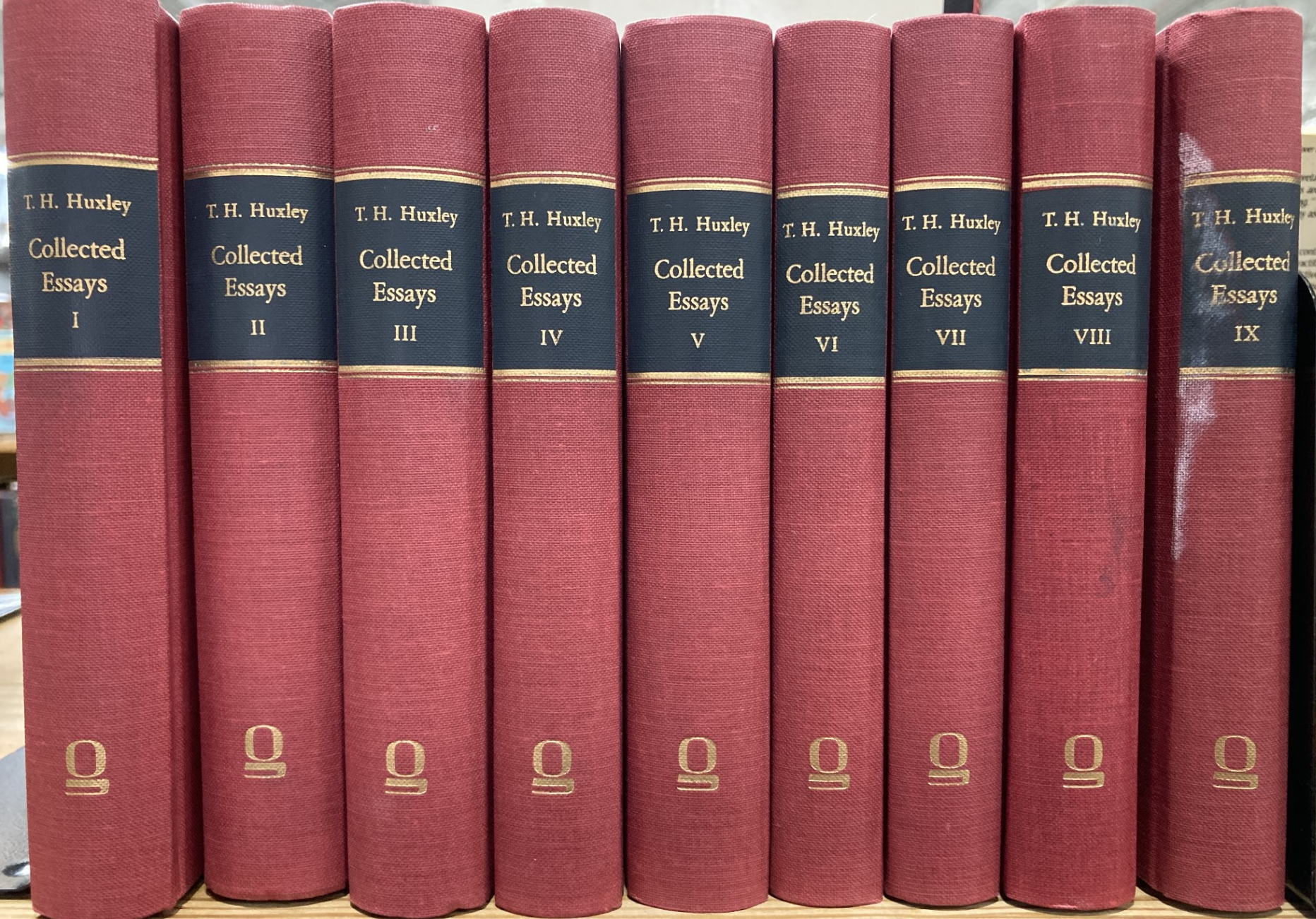
Collected essays of Huxley

During his life, and especially in the last ten years after retirement, Huxley wrote on many issues relating to the humanities.

Perhaps the best known of these topics is Evolution and Ethics, which deals with the question of whether biology has anything particular to say about moral philosophy. Both Huxley and his grandson Julian Huxley gave Romanes Lectures on this theme. For a start, Huxley dismisses religion as a source of moral authority. Next, he believes the mental characteristics of man are as much a product of evolution as the physical aspects. Thus, human emotions, intellect, and tendency to prefer living in groups and spending resources on raising young are part and parcel of human evolution and therefore inherited.

Despite this, the details of human values and ethics are not inherited: they are partly determined by human culture, and partly chosen on an individual basis. Morality and duty are often at war with natural instincts; ethics cannot be derived from the struggle for existence: "Of moral purpose I see not a trace in nature. That is an article of exclusively human manufacture." It is therefore an individual's responsibility to make ethical choices (see Ethics and Evolutionary ethics). This seems to put Huxley as a compatibilist in the Free Will vs Determinism debate. In this argument, Huxley is diametrically opposed to his long-time friend Herbert Spencer.

Huxley's dissection of Jean-Jacques Rousseau's views on man and society is another example of his later work. The essay undermines Rousseau's ideas on man as a preliminary to undermining his ideas on the ownership of property. Characteristic is: "The doctrine that all men are, in any sense, or have been, at any time, free and equal, is an utterly baseless fiction."

Huxley's method of argumentation (his strategy and tactics of persuasion in speech and print) is itself much studied. His career included controversial debates with scientists, clerics and politicians; persuasive discussions with Royal Commissions and other public bodies; lectures and articles for the general public, and a mass of detailed letter-writing to friends and other correspondents. A large number of textbooks have excerpted his prose for anthologies.

== Royal and other commissions ==
Huxley worked on ten Royal and other commissions (titles somewhat shortened here). The Royal Commission is the senior investigative forum in the British constitution. A rough analysis shows that five commissions involved science and scientific education; three involved medicine and three involved fisheries. Several involve difficult ethical and legal issues. All deal with possible changes to law and/or administrative practice.

=== Royal Commissions ===
- 1862: Trawling for herrings on the coast of Scotland.
- 1863–1865: Sea fisheries of the United Kingdom.
- 1870–1871: The Contagious Diseases Acts.
- 1870–1875: Scientific instruction and the advancement of science.
- 1876: The practice of subjugating live animals to scientific experiments (vivisection).
- 1876–1878: The universities of Scotland.
- 1881–1882: The Medical Acts. [i.e. the legal framework for medicine]
- 1884: Trawl, net and beam trawl fishing.

==== Other commissions ====
- 1866: On the Royal College of Science for Ireland.
- 1868: On science and art instruction in Ireland.

== Family ==
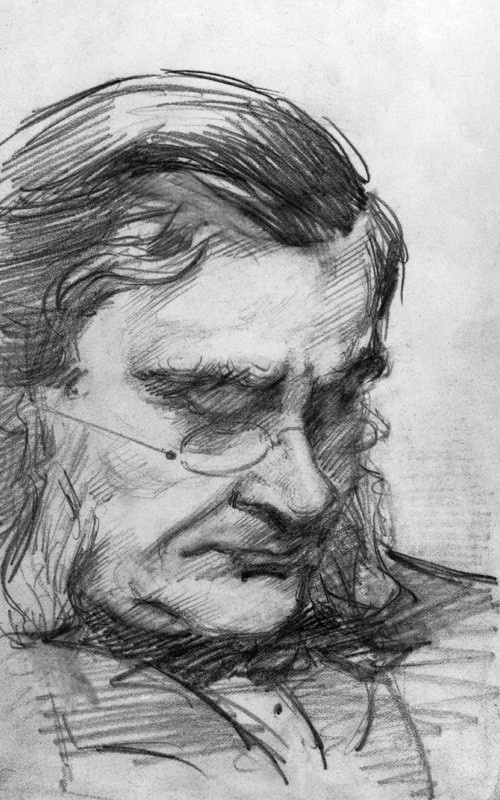
Pencil drawing of Huxley by his daughter, Marian

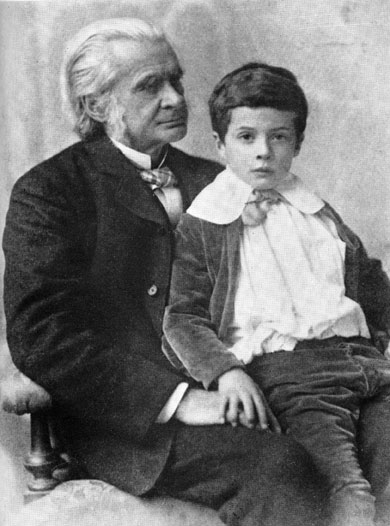
Huxley with his grandson Julian in 1893

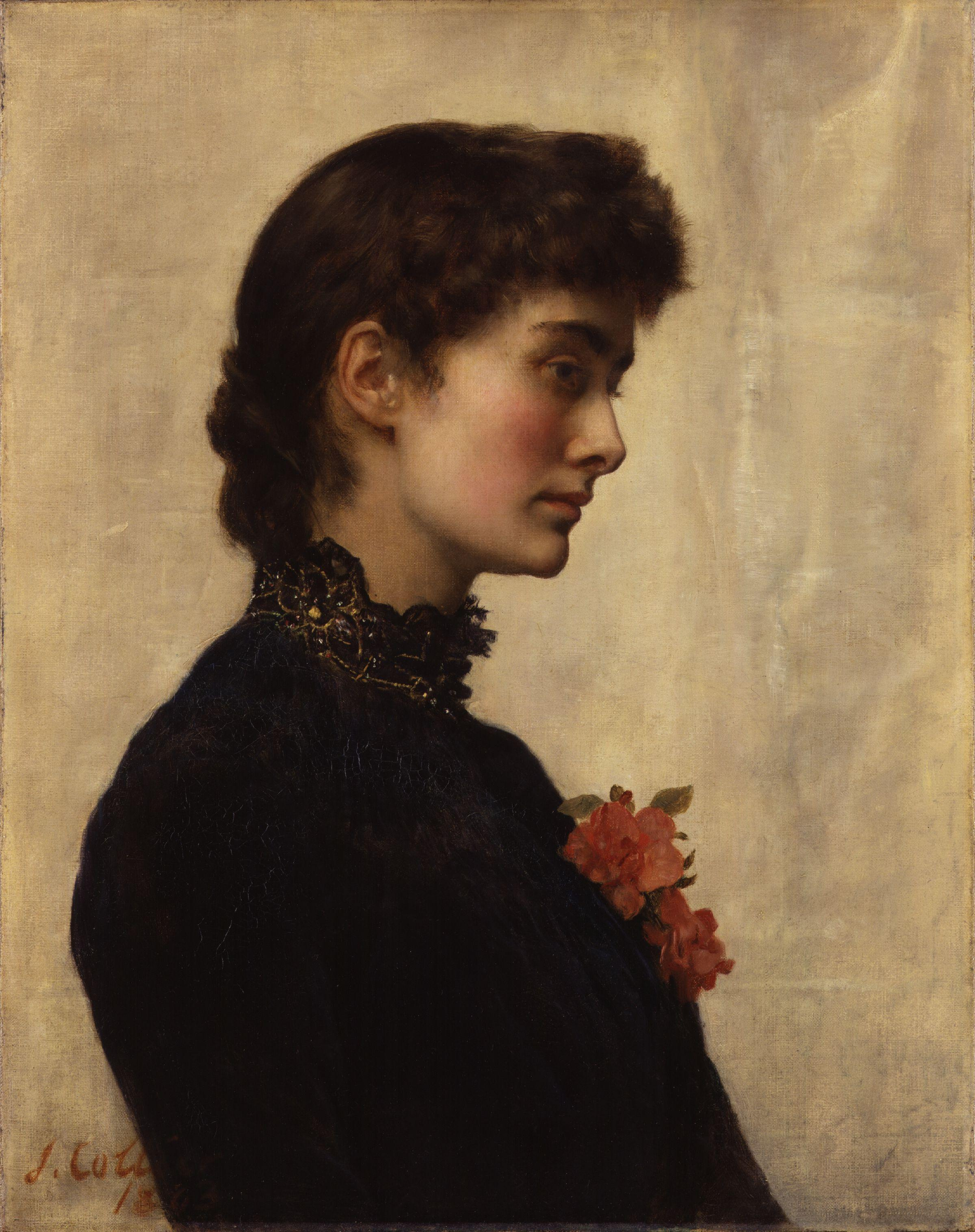
Marian (Mady) Huxley, by her husband John Collier

In 1855 he married Henrietta Anne Heathorn (1825–1914), an English émigrée whom he had met in Sydney, Australia. They kept in correspondence until he was able to send for her. They had five daughters and three sons:

- Noel Huxley (1856–60), died of scarlet fever.
- Jessie Oriana Huxley (1858 −1927), married architect Fred Waller in 1877.
- Marian Huxley (1859–87), married artist John Collier in 1879.
- Leonard Huxley, (1860–1933) author, father of Julian, Aldous and Andrew Huxley.
- Rachel Huxley (1862–1934) married civil engineer Alfred Eckersley in 1884; he died in 1895. They were parents of the physicist Thomas Eckersley and the first BBC Chief Engineer Peter Eckersley.
- Henrietta (Nettie) Huxley (1863–1940), married Harold Roller, and travelled Europe as a singer.
- Henry Huxley (1865–1946), became a fashionable general practitioner in London.
- Ethel Huxley (1866–1941), married her sister's widower John Collier in 1889.

Huxley's relationships with his relatives and children were genial by the standards of the day, so long as they lived their lives honourably, which some did not. After his mother, his eldest sister, Lizzie, was the most important person in his life until his own marriage. He remained on good terms with his children, more than can be said of many Victorian fathers. This excerpt from a letter to Jessie, his eldest daughter, is full of affection:

- "Dearest Jess, You are a badly used young person—you are; and nothing short of that conviction would get a letter out of your still worse used Pater, the bête noir of whose existence is letter-writing. Catch me discussing the Afghan question with you, you little pepper-pot! No, not if I know it..." [goes on nevertheless to give strong opinions of the Afghans, at that time causing plenty of trouble to the British Raj—see Second Anglo-Afghan War] "There, you plague—ever your affec. Daddy, THH." (letter 7 December 1878, Huxley L 1900)

Huxley's descendants include the children of Leonard Huxley:

- Sir Julian Huxley FRS was the first Director of UNESCO and a notable evolutionary biologist and humanist.
- Aldous Huxley was a famous author (Brave New World 1932, Eyeless in Gaza 1936, The Doors of Perception 1954).
- Sir Andrew Huxley OM PRS won the Nobel Prize in Physiology or Medicine in 1963. He was the second Huxley to become President of the Royal Society.

Other significant descendants of Huxley, such as Sir Crispin Tickell, are treated in the Huxley family.

=== Mental problems in the family ===
Biographers have sometimes noted the occurrence of mental illness in the Huxley family. His father became "sunk in worse than childish imbecility of mind", and later died in Barming Asylum; brother George suffered from "extreme mental anxiety" and died in 1863 leaving serious debts. Brother James, a well-known psychiatrist and Superintendent of Kent County Asylum, was at 55 "as near mad as any sane man can be". His favourite daughter, the artistically talented Mady (Marian), who became the first wife of the artist John Collier, was troubled by mental illness for years. She died of pneumonia in her mid-twenties.

About Huxley himself, we have a more complete record. As a young apprentice to a medical practitioner, aged thirteen or fourteen, Huxley was taken to watch a post-mortem dissection. Afterwards, he sank into a "deep lethargy" and, though Huxley ascribed this to dissection poisoning, Bibby and others may be right to suspect that emotional shock precipitated the depression. Huxley recuperated on a farm, looking thin and ill.

The next episode we know of in Huxley's life, when he suffered a debilitating depression, was on the third voyage of HMS Rattlesnake in 1848. Huxley had further periods of depression at the end of 1871, and again in 1873. Finally, in 1884 he sank into another depression, and this time it precipitated his decision to retire in 1885, at the age of 60. This is enough to indicate the way depression (or perhaps a moderate bipolar disorder) interfered with his life, yet unlike some of the other family members, he was able to function extremely well at other times.

The problems continued sporadically into the third generation. Two of Leonard's sons suffered serious depression: Trevennen committed suicide in 1914, and Julian suffered a breakdown in 1913, and five more later in life.

== Satires ==
Darwin's ideas and Huxley's controversies gave rise to many cartoons and satires. It was the debate about man's place in nature that roused such widespread satire. Darwin's head on a monkey's body is one of the visual clichés of the age. The "Great Hippocampus Question" attracted particular attention:

- "Monkeyana" signed 'Gorilla'. this turned out to be by Sir Philip Egerton MP, amateur naturalist, fossil fish collector, and Richard Owen's patron. The last two stanzas include a reference to Huxley's comment that "Life is too short to occupy oneself with the slaying of the slain more than once.":
  Next HUXLEY replies
  That OWEN he lies
  And garbles his Latin quotation;
  That his facts are not new,
  His mistakes not a few,
  Detrimental to his reputation.
  To twice slay the slain
  By dint of the Brain
  (Thus HUXLEY concludes his review)
  Is but labour in vain,
  unproductive of gain,
  And so I shall bid you "Adieu"!
- "The Gorilla's dilemma": First two lines:
  Say am I a man or a brother,
  Or only an anthropoid ape?
- Report of a sad case recently tried before the Lord Mayor, Owen versus Huxley. Lord Mayor asks whether either side is known to the police:
  Policeman X — Huxley, your Worship, I take to be a young hand, but very vicious; but Owen I have seen before. He got into trouble with an old bone man, called Mantell, who never could be off complaining as Owen prigged his bones. People did say that the old man never got over it, and Owen worritted him to death; but I don't think it was so bad as that. Hears as Owen takes the chair at a crib in Bloomsbury. I don't think it will be a harmonic meeting altogether. And Huxley hangs out in Jermyn Street.

Huxley's low set included Hooker "in the green and vegetable line" and "Charlie Darwin, the pigeon-fancier"; Owen's "crib in Bloomsbury" was the British Museum, of which Natural History was but one department. Jermyn Street is known for its shops of men's clothing, possibly implying that Huxley was a dandy.

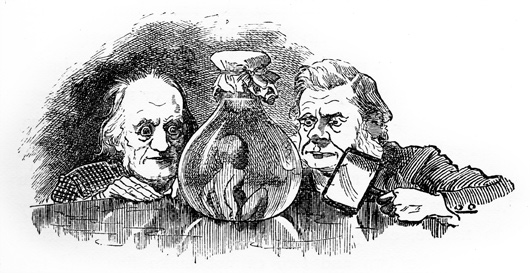
Huxley (right) and Richard Owen inspect a "water baby" in Edward Linley Sambourne's illustration (1881).

- The Water Babies: A fairy tale for a land baby by Charles Kingsley (serialised in Macmillan's Magazine 1862–1863, published in book form, with additions, in 1863). Kingsley had been among first to give a favourable review to Darwin's On the Origin of Species, having "long since ... learnt to disbelieve the dogma of the permanence of species", and the story includes a satire on the reaction to Darwin's theory, with the main scientific participants appearing, including Richard Owen and Huxley. In 1892, Huxley's five-year-old grandson Julian saw the illustration by Sambourne (right) and wrote his grandfather a letter asking:
  Dear Grandpater — Have you seen a Waterbaby? Did you put it in a bottle? Did it wonder if it could get out? Could I see it some day? — Your loving Julian.
  Huxley wrote back:
  My dear Julian — I could never make sure about that Water Baby ... My friend who wrote the story of the Water Baby was a very kind man and very clever. Perhaps he thought I could see as much in the water as he did — There are some people who see a great deal, and some who see very little in the same things.
  When you grow up I dare say you will be one of the great-deal seers, and see things more wonderful than the Water Babies where other folks can see nothing.

== Racism debate ==
In October 2021 a history group reviewing colonial links told Imperial College London that, because Huxley "might now be called racist", it should remove a bust of him and rename its Huxley Building. The group of 21 academics had been launched in the wake of Black Lives Matter protests in 2020 to address Imperial's "links to the British Empire" and build a "fully inclusive organisation". It reported that Huxley's paper Emancipation – Black and White "espouses a racial hierarchy of intelligence" that helped to feed ideas around eugenics, which "falls far short of Imperial's modern values", and that his theories "might now be called 'racist' in as much as he used racial divisions and hierarchical categorisation in his attempt to understand their origins in his studies of human evolution". Imperial's provost Ian Walmsley responded that Imperial would "confront, not cover up, uncomfortable or awkward aspects of our past" and this was "very much not a 'cancel culture' approach". Students would be consulted before management decided on any action to be taken.

A critical response by Nick Matzke said that Huxley was a public, longstanding abolitionist who wrote "the most complete demonstration of the specific diversity of the types of mankind will nowise constrain science to spread her ægis over their [slaveholders'] atrocities" and "the North is justified in any expenditure of blood or of money, which shall eradicate a system hopelessly inconsistent with the moral elevation, the political freedom, or the economical progress of the American people"; a major opponent of the racist position of polygenism, as well as the position that some human races were transitional (in 1867 Huxley said "there was no shade of justification for the assertion that any existing modification of mankind now known was to be considered as an intermediate form between man and the animals next below him in the scale of the fauna of the world"); a vehement opponent of the scientific racist James Hunt; and a political radical who believed in granting equal rights and the vote to both black people and women.

== Cultural references ==
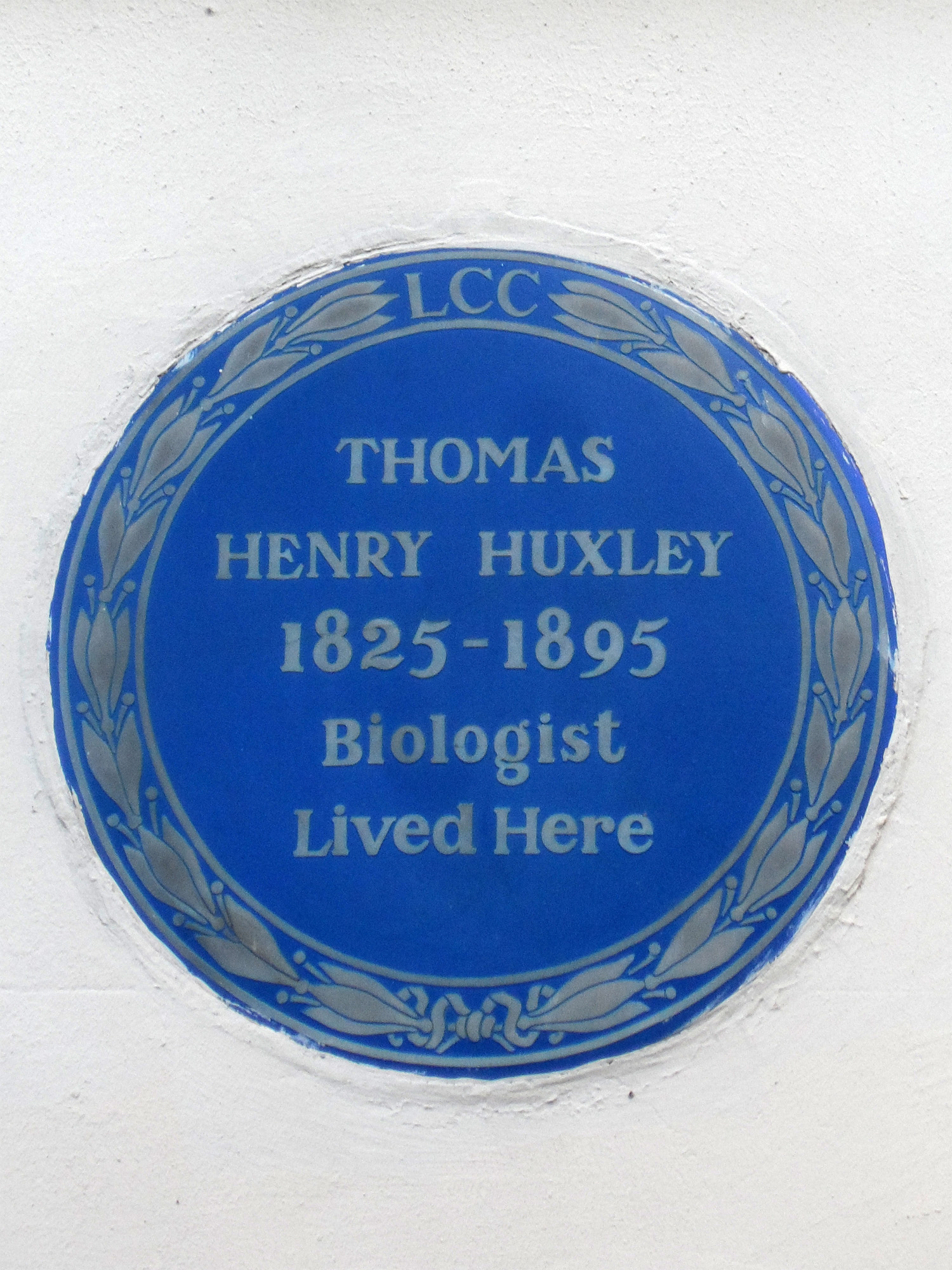
Blue plaque commemorating Huxley in Marlborough Place in London

- Huxley appears alongside Charles Darwin and Samuel Wilberforce in the 2003 play Darwin in Malibu, written by Crispin Whittell, and is portrayed by Toby Jones in the 2009 film Creation.
- Huxley is referred to as the tutor of the main character, Edward Prendick, in H. G. Wells' 1896 science fiction novel The Island of Dr Moreau.
- In Horse Feathers, a 1932 Marx Brothers film, Groucho Marx portrays Prof. Quincy Adams Wagstaff, Dean of Huxley College, while its rival team is Darwin College.
- In Walking with Dinosaurs − The Arena Spectacular, the human character who presents the show and is on stage to show the scale of the dinosaurs is a palaeontologist called Huxley.

== See also ==
- Epiphenomenalism
- European and American voyages of scientific exploration
- List of presidents of the Royal Society
- Huxley Memorial Medal and Lecture
- The Huxley Lecture

== Sources ==
- Encyclopædia Britannica Online (2006), Thomas Henry Huxley, Encyclopædia Britannica Inc., archived from the original on 26 November 2010
- Barr, Alan P., ed. (1997), Thomas Henry Huxley's Place in Science and Letters: Centenary Essays, Georgia: Athens
- Bibby, Cyril (1959), T.H. Huxley: scientist, humanist and educator, London: Watts
- Bibby, Cyril (1972), Scientist Extraordinary: the life and work of Thomas Henry Huxley 1825–1895, Oxford: Pergamon
- Browne, Janet (1995), Charles Darwin, vol. 1: Voyaging, Cambridge University Press
- Browne, Janet (2002), Charles Darwin, vol. 2: The Power of Place, Cambridge University Press
- Burkhardt, F.; et al., eds. (1984) [1984 onwards: continuing series], The Correspondence of Charles Darwin, Cambridge University Press
- Clack, Jennifer A. (2002). Gaining ground: the origin and evolution of tetrapods. Bloomington, Ind.: Indiana Univ. Press. ISBN 978-0-253-34054-2.
- Clark, Ronald W. (1968), The Huxleys, London: Heinemann
- Cosans, Christopher (2009), Owen's Ape and Darwin's Bulldog: Beyond Darwinism and Creationism, Bloomington: Indiana University Press
- Cronin, Helena (1991), The Ant and the Peacock: Altruism and Sexual Selection from Darwin to Today, Cambridge University Press
- Darwin, Charles (1887), Darwin, Francis (ed.), The life and letters of Charles Darwin, including an autobiographical chapter, vol. 2, London: John Murray, archived from the original on 1 August 2011
- Darwin, Charles; Wallace, Alfred Russel (1858), "On the Tendency of Species to form Varieties; and on the Perpetuation of Varieties and Species by Natural Means of Selection", Journal of the Proceedings of the Linnean Society of London. Zoology, vol. 3, no. 9, London, pp. (Read 1 July): 45–62, doi:10.1111/j.1096-3642.1858.tb02500.x
- Darwin, Charles (1859), On the Origin of Species by Means of Natural Selection, or the Preservation of Favoured Races in the Struggle for Life (1st ed.), London: John Murray, archived from the original on 5 October 2008
- Darwin, Francis; Seward, A.C. (1903), More Letters of Charles Darwin. 2 vols, London: John Murray
- Desmond, Adrian (1994), Huxley: vol 1 The Devil's Disciple, London: Michael Joseph, ISBN 0-7181-3641-1
- Desmond, Adrian (1997), Huxley: vol 2 Evolution's High Priest, London: Michael Joseph
- Desmond, Adrian (1998), Huxley: vol 1 and 2, London: Penguin
- Desmond, Adrian; Moore, James (1991), Darwin, London: Penguin Books, Ltd.
- Di Gregorio, Mario A (1984), T.H. Huxley's Place in Natural Science, New Haven: Yale University Press, ISBN 0-300-03062-2
- Duncan, David (1908), Life and Letters of Herbert Spencer. 2 vols, Michael Joseph
- Eve, A.S.; Creasey, C.H. (1945), "Life and work of John Tyndall", Nature, 156 (3955), London: Macmillan: 189–190, Bibcode:1945Natur.156..189R, doi:10.1038/156189a0, S2CID 4031321
- Foster, Michael; Lankester, E. Ray (1898–1903), The scientific memoirs of Thomas Henry Huxley. 4 vols and supplement, London: Macmillan, ISBN 978-1-4326-4011-8;
- Galton, Francis (1892), Hereditary Genius (2nd ed.), London: Macmillan and Co., pp. xix
- Gould, Stephen Jay (1991), Bully for Brontosaurus, Random House
- Holland, Linda Z (2007), "A chordate with a difference", Nature, 447 (447/7141, pp. 153–155), UK: Nature Publishing Group: 153–5, Bibcode:2007Natur.447..153H, doi:10.1038/447153a, ISSN 0028-0836, PMID 17495912, S2CID 5549210
- Huxley, Julian (1935), "T.H. Huxley's Diary of the Voyage of HMS Rattlesnake", Nature, 137 (3454), London: Chatto & Windus: 48–49, Bibcode:1936Natur.137...48Y, doi:10.1038/137048a0, S2CID 41532921
- Huxley, Leonard (1900), Life and Letters of Thomas Henry Huxley. 2 vols 8vo, London: Macmillan
- Huxley, Thomas Henry (1854), "Review of Vestiges of the Natural History of Creation, tenth edition", British and Foreign Medico-Chirurgical Review (13)
- Huxley, Thomas Henry (1855), "On certain zoological arguments commonly adduced in favour of the hypothesis of the progressive development of animal life in time", Proceedings of the Royal Institution 2 (1854–58)
- Huxley, Thomas Henry (1857), "untitled letter on theory of glaciers", Philosophical Magazine, xiv: 241
- Huxley, Thomas Henry (1984) [1859], The Oceanic Hydrozoa, London: The Ray Society, ISBN 0-300-03062-2
- Huxley, Thomas Henry (1860a), "On species, and races and their origin", Proc. Roy. Inst. 1858–62 (III): 195
- Huxley, Thomas Henry (1860b), "The origin of species", Westminster Review (April)
- Huxley, Thomas Henry (1861). "On the zoological relations of man with the lower animals". Natural History Review. 2. Vol. 1, no. 1. pp. 67–84 – via Wikisource.
- Huxley, Thomas Henry (1862a), "On the fossil remains of Man", Proceedings of the Royal Institution (1858–62), III, London: The Royal Institution
- Huxley, Thomas Henry (1862b), On our knowledge of the causes of the phenomena of organic nature, London: Robert Hardwicke
- Huxley, Thomas Henry (1863), Evidence as to Man's Place in Nature, London: Williams & Norwood
- Huxley, Thomas Henry (1864), "Further remarks on the human remains from the Neanderthal", Natural History Review (4), London: 429–46
- Huxley, Thomas Henry (1870), "Lay Sermons, Addresses and Reviews", Nature, 3 (54), London: 22–23, Bibcode:1870Natur...3...22G, doi:10.1038/003022a0, S2CID 4071308, archived from the original on 22 March 2020
- Huxley, Thomas Henry (1877), American Addresses.
- Huxley, Thomas Henry (1887), "On the reception of the 'Origin of Species'", in Darwin, Francis (ed.), Life & Letters of Charles Darwin, London: John Murray
- Huxley, Thomas Henry (1893–94), Collected essays. 9 vols. Vol 1: Methods and results; vol 2: Darwiniana; vol 3: Science and education; vol 4: Science and Hebrew tradition; vol 5: Science and Christian tradition; vol 6 :Hume, with helps to the study of Berkeley; vol 7:Man's place in nature; vol 8: Discourses biological and geological; vol 9: Evolution and ethics, and other essays, London: Macmillan
- Huxley, Thomas Henry (1893–1894a), Collected essays: vol 2 Darwiniana, London: Macmillan
- Huxley, Thomas Henry (1893–1894b), Collected essays: vol 3 Science and education, London: Macmillan
- Huxley, Thomas Henry (1898), Darwiniana: Essays, New York: D. Appleton and Company Not to be confused with Darwiniana: Essays and Reviews Pertaining to Darwinism, by Asa Gray.
- Huxley, Thomas Henry (1898–1903), "Preliminary essay upon the systematic arrangement of the fishes of the Devonian epoch", in Foster, Michael; Lankester, E. Ray (eds.), The scientific memoirs of Thomas Henry Huxley, vol. 2, London: Macmillan, pp. 421–460, ISBN 978-1-4326-4011-8;
- Irvine, William (1955). Apes, Angels and Victorians. New York: McGraw-Hill.
- Jensen, J. Vernon (1970), "The X Club: Fraternity of Victorian Scientists", British Journal for the History of Science, 5 (1): 63–72, doi:10.1017/S0007087400010621, PMID 11609564, S2CID 29405737
- Jensen, J. Vernon (1991), Thomas Henry Huxley: Communicating for Science., Newark: University of Delaware
- Lester, Joe (1995), E. Ray Lankester: The Making of Modern British Biology (edited, with additions, by Peter J. Bowler), BSHS Monograph #9
- Lucas, John R. (1979), "Wilberforce and Huxley: A Legendary Encounter", The Historical Journal, 22 (2), Cambridge University Press: 313–30, doi:10.1017/S0018246X00016848, PMID 11617072, S2CID 19198585, archived from the original on 27 June 2020
- Lyons, Sherrie L. (1999), Thomas Henry Huxley: The Evolution of a Scientist, New York: Prometheus
- MacBride, E.W. (1934), Huxley, London: Duckworth
- MacGillivray, John (1852), Narrative of the Voyage of HMS Rattlesnake. 2 vols, London: Boone
- Mackenzie, Norman; Mackenzie, Jenne, eds. (1982), The Diaries of Beatrice Webb, vol. 1, 1873–1892, London: Virago
- Mayr, Ernst (1982), The Growth of Biological Thought, Harvard University Press
- McMillan, N.D.; Meehan, J (1980), John Tyndall: 'X'emplar of Scientific & Technological Education, Dublin: National Council for Educational Awards, ISBN 9780905717098, archived from the original on 3 November 2022. (despite its chaotic organisation, this little book contains some nuggets that are well worth sifting)
- Morley, John (1917), Recollections. 2 vols, Macmillan
- Osborn, Henry Fairfield (1924), Impressions of Great Naturalists
- Owen, Richard (1858), "On the characters, principles of division, and primary groups of the Class Mammalia", Proc Linnean Society: Zoology (2): 1–37
- Owen, Richard (1860), "Darwin on the Origin of Species", Edinburgh Review (111): 487–532
- Paradis, James; Williams, George C. (1989), Evolution and Ethics: T. H. Huxley's 'Evolution and Ethics', with New Essays on Its Victorian and Sociobiological Context, Princeton, N.J: Princeton University Press
- Paradis, James G. (1978), T.H. Huxley: Man's Place in Nature, University of Nebraska Press, Lincoln
- Paul, G. (2002), Dinosaurs of the Air: The Evolution and Loss of Flight in Dinosaurs and Birds, Baltimore: Johns Hopkins University Press, pp. 171–224, ISBN 0-8018-6763-0
- Peterson, Houston (1932), Huxley: Prophet of Science, London: Longmans, Green.
- Poulton, Edward Bagnall (1896), Charles Darwin and the Theory of Natural Selection, London: Cassell.(Chapter 18 deals with Huxley and natural selection)
- Pritchard, M. (1994), A directory of London photographers 1891–1908
- Prum, R (2003), "Are current critiques of the theropod origin of birds science? Rebuttal To Feduccia 2002", The Auk, 120 (2): 550–561, doi:10.1642/0004-8038(2003)120[0550:ACCOTT]2.0.CO;2 (inactive 18 November 2026), S2CID 85696237
- Ruse, Michael (1997), "Thomas Henry Huxley and the Status of Evolution as Science", in Barr, Alan P. (ed.), Thomas Henry Huxley's place in science and letters: centenary essays, Georgia: Athens
- Spencer, Herbert (1904), Autobiography. 2 vols, London: Williams & Norgate
- Tyndall, John; Huxley, Thomas Henry (1857), "On the Structure and Motion of Glaciers", Philosophical Transactions, 147: 327–346, Bibcode:1857RSPT..147..327T, doi:10.1098/rstl.1857.0016, archived from the original on 22 March 2020
- Tyndall, John (1896), The Glaciers of the Alps (Original edition 1860 ed.), Longmans, Green and Co.
- Webb, Beatrice (1926), "My Apprenticeship", Nature, 118 (2980), London: Longmans: 831, Bibcode:1926Natur.118..831C, doi:10.1038/118831a0
- Wilberforce, Samuel (1860), "Darwin's Origin of Species", Quarterly Review (102): 225–64
- Wollaston, A.F.R. (1921), Life of Alfred Newton 1829–1907
- White, Paul (2003), Thomas Huxley: Making the 'Man of Science', Cambridge University Press

== Selected works ==
=== Books ===
- On Our Knowledge of the Causes of the Phenomena of Organic Nature (1862)
- Evidence as to Man’s Place in Nature (1863)
- Lay Sermons, Addresses and Reviews (1870)
- Critiques and Addresses (1873)
- American Addresses (1877)
- The Crayfish (1880)
- Science and Culture, and Other Essays (1881)
- Essays upon Some Controverted Questions (1892)
- Science and Hebrew Tradition (1893)
- Evolution and Ethics and Other Essays (1893)

Academic offices
Preceded by Thomas Wharton Jones	Fullerian Professor of Physiology; 1855–1858	Succeeded by Richard Owen
Preceded by John Marshall	Fullerian Professor of Physiology; 1865–1869	Succeeded by Michael Foster
Professional and academic associations
Preceded by William Spottiswoode	34th President of the Royal Society; 1883–1885	Succeeded by George Stokes
Awards and achievements
Preceded by George Newport	Royal Medal; 1852	Succeeded by Charles Darwin
Preceded by L-G de Koninck	Wollaston Medal; 1876	Succeeded by Robert Mallet
Preceded by George Bentham	Clarke Medal; 1880	Succeeded by Frederick McCoy
Preceded by Alphonse de Candolle	Linnaean Medal; 1890	Succeeded by Jean-Baptiste Bornet
Preceded by Joseph Dalton Hooker	Darwin Medal; 1894	Succeeded by Giovanni Grassi
