= Henrietta A. Huxley =

British poet (1825–1914)

Henrietta Anne Huxley
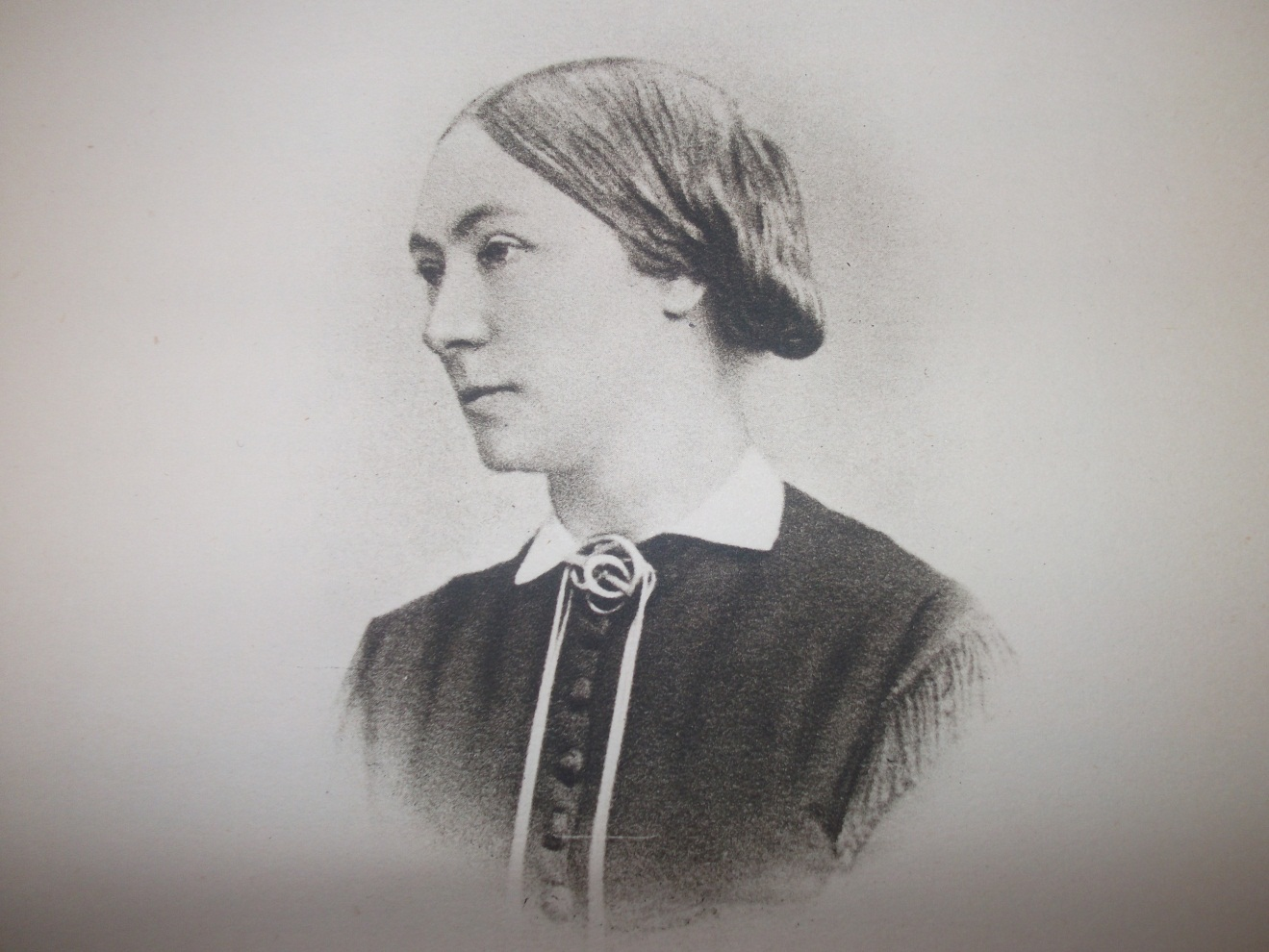
- Born: Henrietta Anne Heathorn; 1 July 1825
- Died: 5 April 1914 (aged 88); Eastbourne, England
- Resting place: East Finchley Cemetery
- Occupation: Poet
- Spouse: Thomas Henry Huxley (m. 1855; died 1895)
- Children: 8; including Leonard and Marian

Henrietta Anne Huxley (née Heathorn; 1 July 1825 – 5 April 1914) was an English poet. Lines from her poem on the death of Robert Browning were inscribed on the tombstone of her husband, biologist Thomas Henry Huxley.

== Early life ==
Henrietta Anne Heathorn was born in the West Indies, the daughter of Sarah Henrietta Richardson (née Harris) and Henry Heathorn, a brewer. She was educated in Neuwied, Germany, where she developed the proficiency in German that she'd put to use in later life.

At 18, in 1843, she and her mother and half-sister joined her father in Australia, where he had established a brewery and sawmill. The following year, her half-sister, Oriana, married Sydney merchant William Fanning.

== Marriage ==
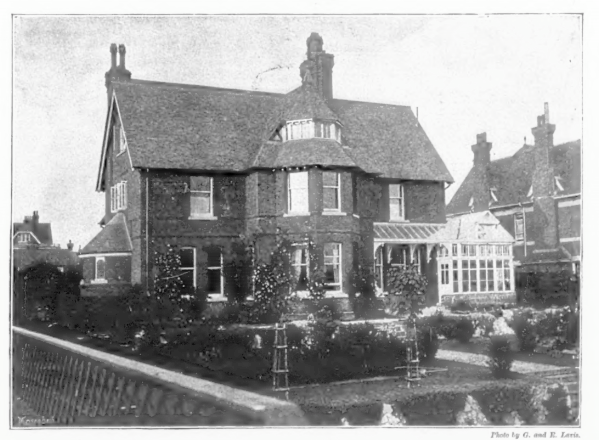
Hodeslea, Eastbourne, home of the Huxleys

Henrietta was keeping house for Fanning when she met Thomas Henry Huxley in July 1847, shortly after his arrival in Sydney. He was working as an assistant surgeon and zoologist on HMS Rattlesnake. They became engaged on their sixth meeting, though their engagement lasted eight years. They corresponded throughout.

Henrietta arrived in London in May 1855, and married Huxley on 21 July at All Saints' Church, Finchley Road. They spent their honeymoon in Tenby, Wales. They began married life at 14 Waverley Place, St John's Wood, where Henrietta assisted Huxley by translating German and drawing diagrams to illustrate his lectures. The Times stated that:

In Huxley's scientific work, her knowledge of German was often of great use. At one time she helped to translate special articles for the scientific reviews, and always her sound literary sense and demand for entire clearness of statement made her his chosen fireside critic.

The Huxleys had eight children together: Noel (1856–60), Jessie Oriana (1858−1927), Marian (1859–87), Leonard (1860–1933), Rachel (1862–1934), Henrietta (1863–1940), Henry (1865–1946), and Ethel (1866–1941).

== Writing ==
In the words of The Times, the "cares of a large and growing family pushed into the background her own literary impulses" but Huxley wrote verse, translations, and stories. She began but did not complete a translation of Kater Murr, and wrote nonsense verses and stories for her children.

After her children had left home, she re-devoted herself to writing poetry, as well as returning to music. At 86, she published a volume of verse, and one of her poems appeared in The English Review.

T. H. Huxley died in 1895. His tombstone was inscribed with the last lines of Henrietta's poem on the funeral of Robert Browning, as he had requested.

In 1907, Henrietta published a selection of her husband's writings as Aphorisms and Reflections from the Writings of T. H. Huxley, and in 1913 three of his poems along with her own.

== Final years and death ==
Henrietta Anne Huxley died on 5 April 1914. She was buried at East Finchley Cemetery and Crematorium.

== Bibliography ==
- Aphorisms and Reflections from the works of T. H. Huxley, ed. Henrietta A. Huxley (London: Watts, 1911)
- Poems of Henrietta A. Huxley with Three of Thomas Henry Huxley (London: Duckworth, 1913)
