= Marian Collier (painter) =

British painter (1859–1887)

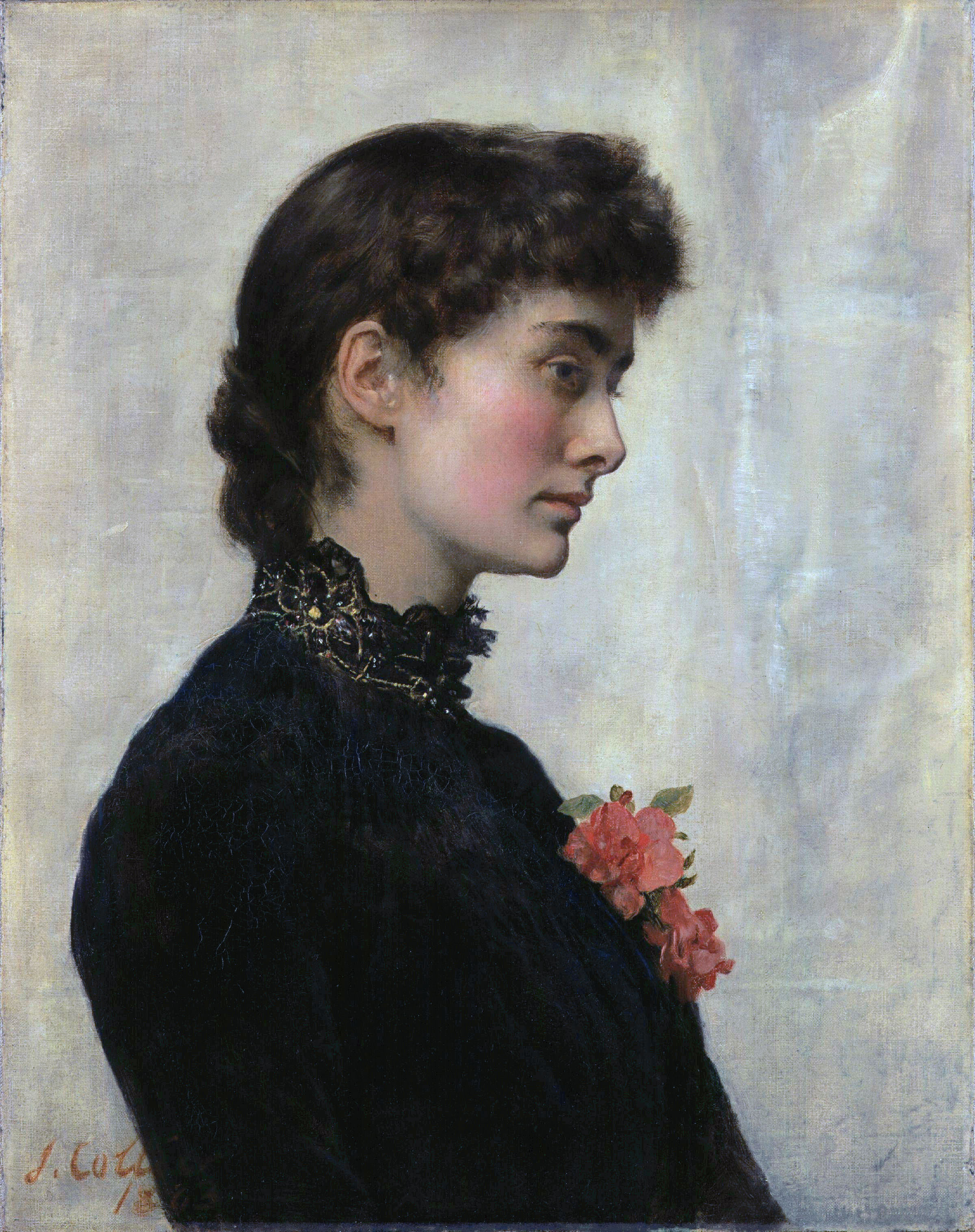
- Painting of Marion Collier (née Huxley), from between 1882 and 1883, by John Collier
- Born: 1859; London, England
- Died: December 1887 (aged 27–28)
- Spouse: John Collier (m. 1879)

Marian "Mady" Collier (née Huxley; 1859–1887) also spelled as Marion Huxley, was a British painter and is associated with the Pre-Raphaelite Brotherhood.

== Biography ==
Marian Huxley was born in 1859 in London, to father Thomas Henry Huxley and mother Henrietta Anne Heathorn. She had seven siblings, including her brother Leonard Huxley. She studied painting at the Slade School of Fine Art in London. Her work was shown at the Royal Academy of Arts and the Grosvenor Gallery.

On 30 June 1879 Huxley married the British writer and portrait painter, John Collier, also a Slade graduate. Together they had a daughter named Joyce, their only child in 1884. After the birth of Joyce, Huxley suffered from "nervous hysteria" (possibly postpartum depression) and in November 1887 she was taken to Paris for treatment with Jean-Martin Charcot, however, she contracted pneumonia and died in December 1887. She had erratic behavior and possibly mental illness, which appeared to increase in symptoms before she died.

After Marian died, John Collier married her younger sister Ethel Huxley in 1889 in Norway.

Collier's work can be found in museum collections, including at the National Portrait Gallery in London, and the Science Museum in London.
