= Wittelsbach-Graff Diamond =

Blue diamond

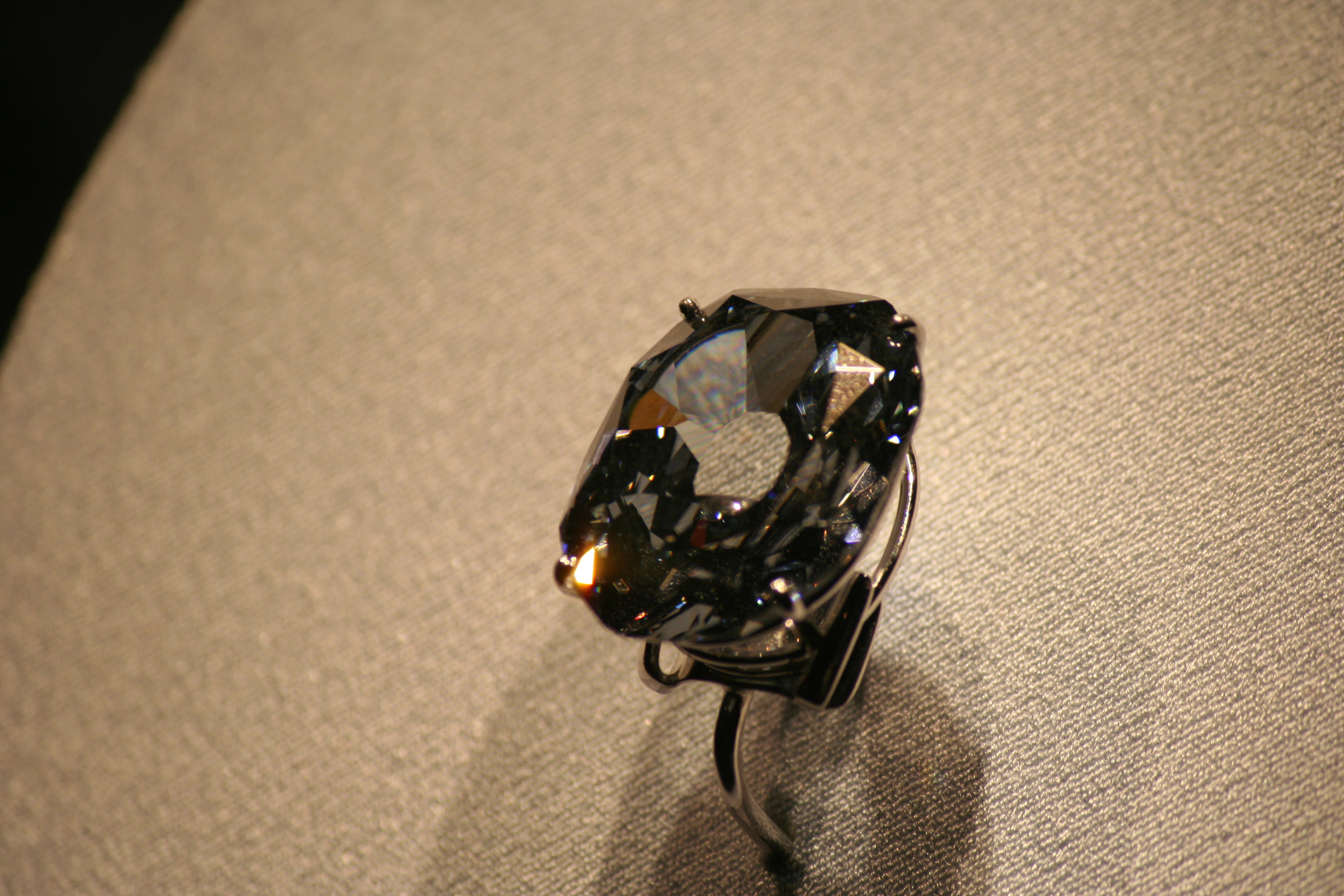
- Wittelsbach-Graff Diamond, on display at the National Museum of Natural History
- Weight: 31.06 carats (6.212 g)
- Color: Fancy Deep Blue
- Cut: Antique oval stellar brilliant
- Country of origin: Indian subcontinent
- Mine of origin: Kollur Mine, Guntur district
- Discovered: Mid-1600s by Golconda Sultanate
- Original owner: Nawabs of Punjab
- Owner: Sheikh Hamad bin Khalifa Al Thani, Father Emir of Qatar
- Estimated value: US$80 million (June 2011)

The Wittelsbach-Graff Diamond is a 31.06-carat (6.212 g), deep-blue diamond with internally flawless clarity, originating in the Kollur Mine, India. Laurence Graff purchased the Wittelsbach Diamond in 2008 for £16.4 million. In 2010, Graff revealed he had had the diamond cut by three diamond cutters to remove flaws. The diamond was now more than 4 carats (800 mg) lighter and was renamed the Wittelsbach-Graff Diamond. There is controversy, as critics claim the recutting has so altered the diamond, compromising its historical integrity.

Graff disagreed: "I decided that to create beauty, or acts of beauty, is not a sin. All we did was remove the blemishes and now it's true perfection."

== Wittelsbach Diamond ==
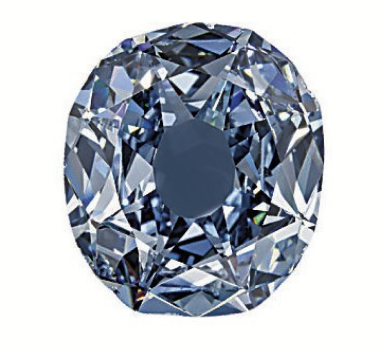
The Wittelsbach diamond, before being recut by Graff.

The original Wittelsbach Diamond, also known as Der Blaue Wittelsbacher, was a 35.56-carat (7.112 g) fancy, deep, greyish-blue diamond with VS2 clarity that had been part of both the Austrian and the Bavarian Crown Jewels.

Its colour and clarity had been compared to the Hope Diamond. The diamond had measured 24.40 millimetres (0.961 in) in diameter and 8.29 millimetres (0.326 in) in depth. It had 82 facets arranged in an atypical pattern. The star facets on the crown were vertically split, and the pavilion had sixteen needle-like facets arranged in pairs, pointing outward from the culet facet.

== History ==
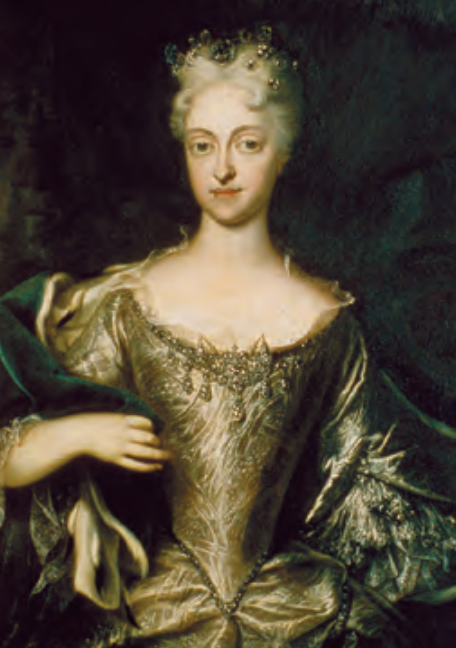
Maria Amalia of Austria's bridal portrait shows the large blue diamond as the centerpiece in her hair ornament. Detail from a painting by Frans van Stampart, 1722.

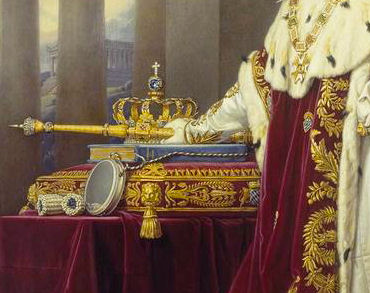
The Wittelsbach Diamond in the Crown of Bavaria, just beneath the cross.

The diamond originates from the Kollur mines of Guntur district in Andhra Pradesh, India. The story that Philip IV of Spain purchased the jewel and included it in the dowry of his teenage daughter, Margaret Teresa, in 1664 is apocryphal. The first time the diamond was mentioned is about fifty years later when it was already in Vienna. It was in the possession of the Habsburg family and came to Munich when, in 1722, Maria Amalia married Charles of Bavaria, a member of the Wittelsbach family.

In 1745, the Wittelsbach Diamond was first mounted on the Bavarian Elector's Order of the Golden Fleece. When Maximilian IV Joseph became the first king of Bavaria in 1806, he commissioned a royal crown that prominently displayed the diamond. Until 1918, the jewel remained on top of the Bavarian crown. It was seen last in public at Ludwig III of Bavaria's funeral in 1921.

The Wittelsbach family tried to sell the diamond in 1931 during the Great Depression but found no buyers. It eventually sold the jewel in 1951. In 1958, the stone was exhibited at the World Expo in Brussels. In the 1960s, the Goldmuntz family asked Joseph Komkommer, a jeweller, to re-cut the diamond, but Komkommer recognised its historical significance and refused. Instead, he joined a group of dealers that bought it. The diamond had been in a private collection since 1964; Helmut Horten had presented it to his wife Heidi at their wedding.

On 10 December 2008, the 35.56-carat (7.112 g) Wittelsbach Diamond was sold to London-based jeweller Laurence Graff for £16.4 million sterling, or US$23.4 million, at the time the highest price ever paid at auction for a diamond. (The previous record had been held by a pear-shaped 100-carat (20 g) stone named the Star of the Season.) The record was eclipsed on 16 November 2010, when a 24.78 carat pink diamond was sold for £29 million Sterling, or US$46 million, again to Mr. Graff.

In June 2011, Graff apparently sold the diamond to the former emir of Qatar, Hamad bin Khalifa, for at least US$80 million.

=== Alteration ===
If you discovered a Leonardo da Vinci with a tear in it and covered in mud, you would want to repair it. We have similarly cleaned up the diamond and repaired damage caused over the years.

— Francois Graff

Immediately following the sale in 2008, Graff announced his intention to recut the gem to remove damage to the girdle and enhance the colour.

On 7 January 2010, it was reported that the diamond had been recut to enhance the stone's colour and clarity, losing over 4.45 carats (890 mg) in the process. The resulting stone has been renamed the Wittelsbach-Graff. The move was met with heavy criticism by some experts: Gabriel Tolkowsky called it "the end of culture." Shortly after the auction of the diamond, American gem cutter and replicator of famous diamonds Scott Sucher stated, "In the case of the Wittelsbach, what's at stake is at minimum over 350 years of history, as every nick, chip, and scratch has a story to tell. Just because we can't decipher these stories doesn't mean they don't exist." The alteration of the historical stone has been compared by Professor Hans Ottomeyer, director of the Deutsches Historisches Museum of Berlin, to the overpainting of a painting by Rembrandt. It is opined that the recutting was done to increase its market value and, by extension, that of other "fancy diamonds". As a result of the recut, which removed some chips and reduced the size of the culet by 40%, the gem has been re-evaluated by the Gemological Institute of America and its colour grade revised from "fancy deep grayish-blue", the same grade given by GIA to The Hope, to the more desirable "fancy deep blue". The diamond's clarity had also been revised upward from "very slightly included" (VS1) to "internally flawless" (IF).

== See also ==
- List of famous diamonds
- List of individual gemstones
