= Beethoven with the Manuscript of the Missa Solemnis =

1820 portrait by Joseph Karl Stieler

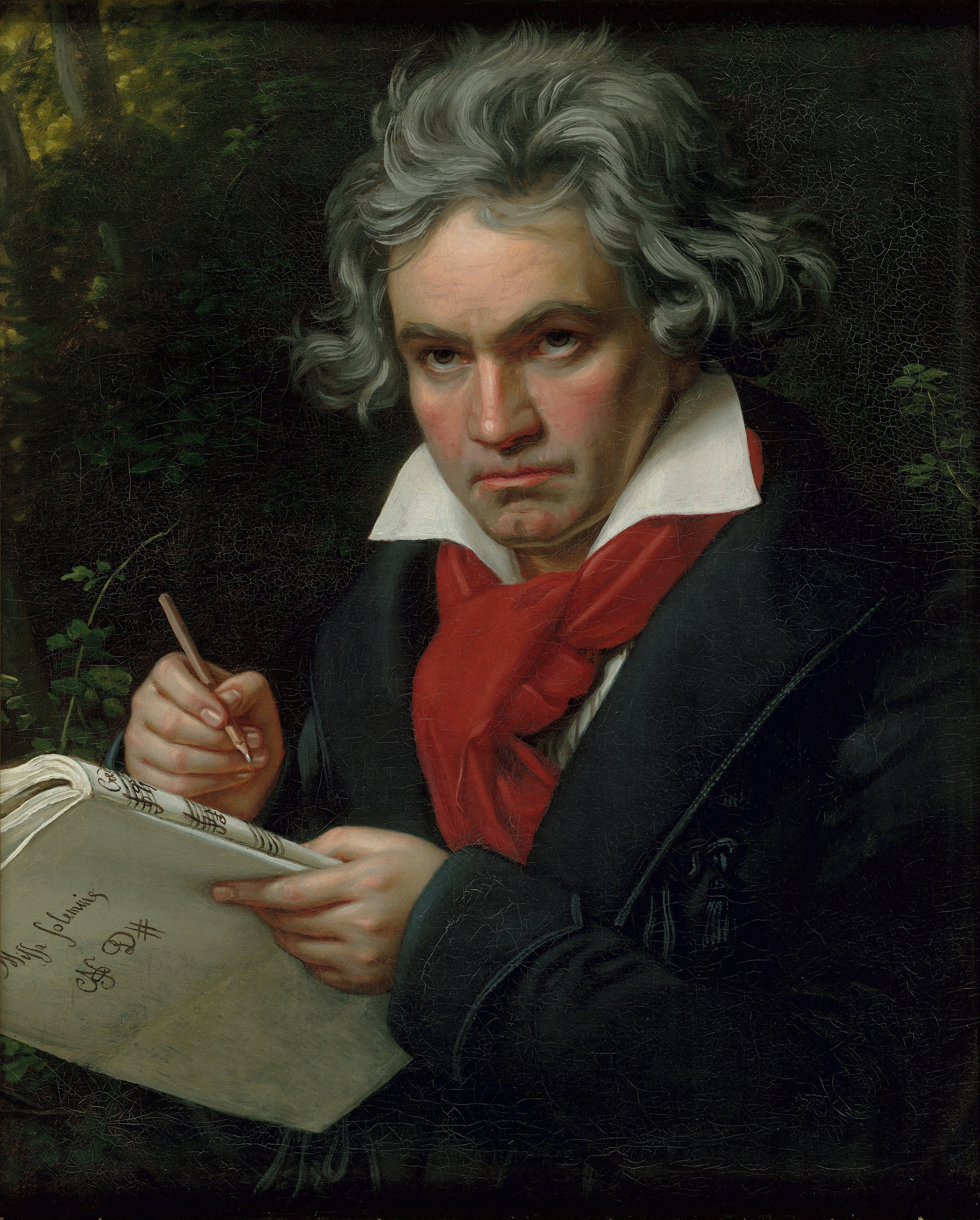
- Artist: Joseph Karl Stieler
- Year: 1820
- Medium: Oil on canvas
- Dimensions: 72 cm × 58.5 cm (28 in × 23.0 in)
- Location: Beethoven-Haus, Bonn

Beethoven with the Manuscript of the Missa Solemnis is a portrait of Ludwig van Beethoven by Joseph Karl Stieler, completed in 1820. It shows Beethoven holding a manuscript of his Missa solemnis. The painting is held by the Beethoven-Haus, in Bonn. Variations on the portrait were produced by, among others, Josef Kriehuber and Andy Warhol.

== Description ==
The portrait is in oil on canvas and shows Beethoven in a deep blue frock coat with a large white collar and red scarf. His grey hair is "unruly, essentially uncombable". He holds the manuscript of his Missa solemnis and appears to be writing. In the background is a grape arbour. The portrait is 72.0 by 58.5 centimetres (28.3 by 23.0 in).

Alexander Wheelock Thayer wrote that the painting was "sketchy" and never fully finished. Anton Schindler felt that the portrait accurately portrayed Beethoven's "characteristic expression", but the lowered head was inconsistent with Beethoven's usual posture. Schindler also asserted that illness caused a marked change in Beethoven's appearance in this portrait as compared to earlier ones.

According to John Clubbe, Stieler's design was "even more dramatic" than the previous portraits by Mähler, using the same portrait of Beethoven's grandfather for inspiration and highlighting "the composer's revolutionary sympathies". Alessandra Comini stated that the portrait included "all the elements dear to future mythmakers", including "genius inspired by inner voices in the presence of nature, with leonine hair writhing wildly in symbolic parallel to the seething turbulence of creativity".

== Creation ==
The painting was started in 1819 and completed in April 1820. It was commissioned by Franz and Antonie Brentano, who were, according to Beethoven, his "best friends in the world". Stieler, who was noted for his portraiture, was in Vienna to paint Emperor Franz at the time he met Beethoven. Beethoven saw having his portrait made as a form of "penance" and allowed only three or four sittings, requiring that Stieler finish painting the body and the portrait's background without him. As a result, according to Alessandra Comini, "Beethoven's arms are not convincingly attached to his shoulders"; later versions of the portrait address this by omitting the arms entirely. Upon completion the portrait was exhibited alongside the Dietrich bust.

== Ownership history ==
The portrait's early ownership history is "obscure"; it may have been briefly held by the Brentano family. Thayer stated that it was initially owned by Stieler's family. It was eventually owned by Wilhelm Spohr, brother of composer Louis Spohr. On his death in 1860, it passed to Rosalie, Countess Sauerma, his daughter.

From 1909 the painting was owned by Henri Hinrichsen of Leipzig, a music publisher with an extensive art collection. This collection, including the portrait of Beethoven, was plundered by the Nazis; Hinrichsen was killed in the Holocaust. After the end of the Second World War in 1945 Henri's son Walter successfully reclaimed some of Henri's collection and brought the portrait to New York City. In 1981 he had a copy made and sold the original to the Beethoven-Haus.

== Reproductions ==
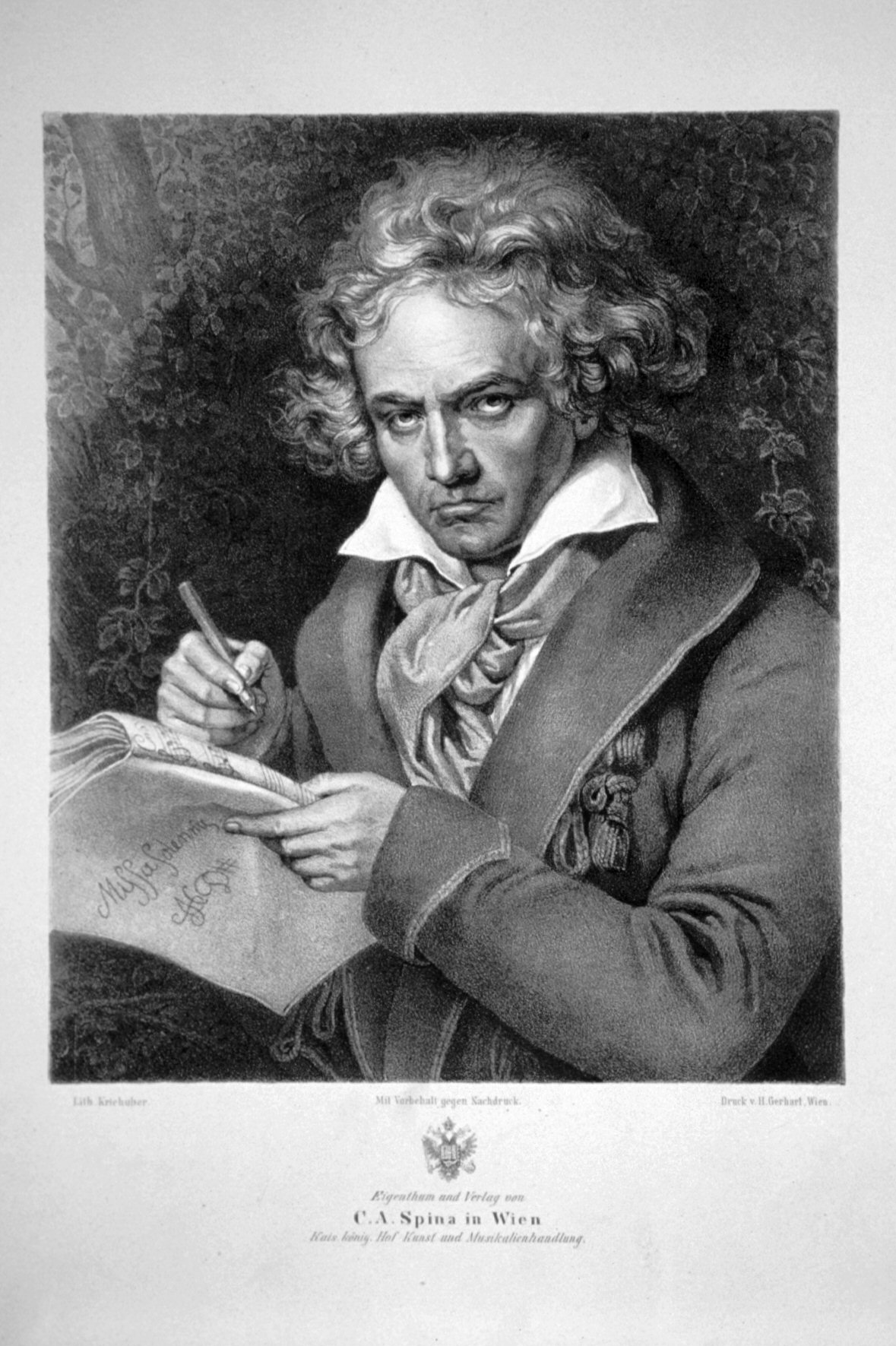
1841 lithograph by Josef Kriehuber

Stieler painted a miniature version of the portrait on ivory. This he gave to Antonie Brentano.

Lithographs of the portrait were published by Artaria in 1826; Beethoven distributed copies to his friends. Comini writes that the "extensive lithographic reproduction" of the work resulted in it having "the greatest influence on Beethoven iconography".

Variations on the portrait were produced by, among others, Josef Kriehuber (1841) and Andy Warhol (1987).
