= Portrait of Lola Montez =

Painting by Joseph Karl Stieler

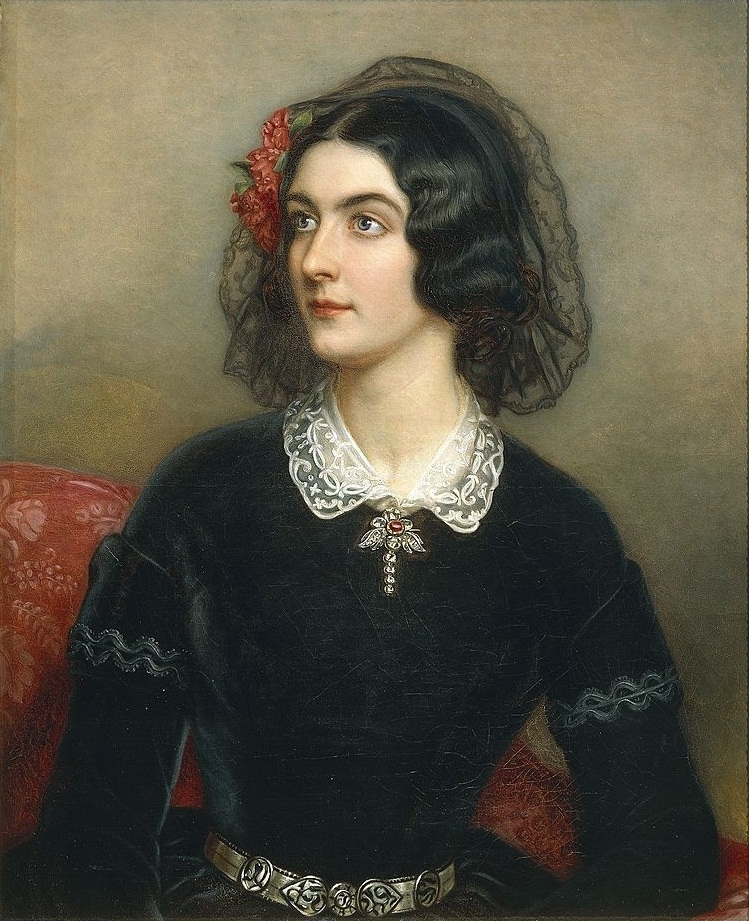
- Artist: Joseph Karl Stieler
- Year: 1847
- Type: Oil on canvas, portrait
- Dimensions: 72 cm × 58.6 cm (28 in × 23.1 in)
- Location: Nymphenburg Palace, Munich

Portrait of Lola Montez is an oil on canvas portrait painting by the German artist Joseph Karl Stieler, from 1847. It is held at the Gallery of Beauties at Ludwig's Nymphenburg Palace, in Munich.

== History and description ==
It depicts the Irish dancer and courtesan Lola Montez, at the time when she was mistress of Ludwig I of Bavaria. Montez, the estranged wife of a British army officer, who adopted a Spanish artistic name, performed on stage across Europe before meeting Ludwig and settling in Bavaria. His extravagance towards her was one of the factors behind his overthrow in the 1848 Revolution.

Stieler had been the court painter to the Bavarian monarchs since 1820 and in 1826 had painted a portrait of Ludwig in his coronation robes. His painting of Montez was placed in the Gallery of Beauties at Nymphenburg Palace.

== Bibliography ==
- Comini, Alessandra. The Changing Image of Beethoven: A Study in Mythmaking. Sunstone Press, 2008.
- Marwick, Arthur. A History of Human Beauty. A&C Black, 2007.
- Seymour, Bruce. Lola Montez: A Life. Yale University Press, 1996.
- Weidner, Thomas. Lola Montez oder eine Revolution in München. Münchner Stadtmuseum, 1998.
- Von Hase-Schmundt, Ulrike. Joseph Stieler, 1781–1858: Sein Leben u. sein Werk. Krit. Verzeichnis d. Werke. Prestel, 1971.
