= Stephane Graff =

Stéphane Graff (born 1965) is a Franco-British, self-taught artist, based in London. His practice focuses on photography and photo-realistic paintings. Having been influenced by the psychoanalytical traditions of Freud and Jung, and scientific methods, Graff, regularly addresses in his work themes of identity, concealment, memory and a secular conception of the sacred. In-depth research led Graff to develop Alter Egos such as the scientist 'Professore' and the ethno-botanist Dr Albert Frique. His most extensive bodies of work are the 'Black Box' paintings, the 'Constrictions' photographic series, and the 'Mille-Feuille' paintings, which are made on numerous strips of wood, combining the disciplines of painting and sculpture. Graff has exhibited internationally. Selected exhibitions include: Galleria Mucciaccia, Rome (2018); Almine Rech Gallery, in London (2016); The Musée d'Art Modern et Contemporain in Nice, France (2013); the Ercel Foundation in Turin, Italy (2010); the Operating Room, Amerikan Hastanesi, Istanbul (2010); the Musee de Marrakech, Morocco (2004); and the Museum of Mankind in London (1991). Graff is the son of billionaire diamond tycoon Laurence Graff.

== Career and works ==
=== Early work ===
In the late 1980s, Graff utilised techniques combining painting, photography and photomontage. In a 1988 solo exhibition there were three categories of work: "Theological Studies", "Feminine Beauty", and "Screaming Portraits". Among the religious works was 'The Last Supper'. In this photomontage, the heads of the disciples are concealed by black triangles, except for Judas, who is concealed by a black square. In 'The Canonisation of Mary Magdalene', the subject is veiled in black and depicted mourning Christ's crucifixion. According to De Dreyer, "By sculpting the halo in black, the artist narrates the transition from prostitute to saint."

In works exploring the theme of feminine beauty, Graff juxtaposed "traditional" and "radical" conceptions of the theme. His earlier treatment of the female nude, such 'Twisted Nude' (1988) was interpreted as referencing renaissance sculpture, and having "an inhuman, stone-like quality".

The "Screaming Portraits" series is characterised by tense, muscular detail and contorted expressions "suggestive of mental illness" It includes 'Agree to Disagree', 'Portrait of the Old Man' and 'Exorcism'.

=== Earthworks ===
Much of Graff's early work was inspired by ancient and tribal art; he was often concerned with memory and man's relationship to the past. In February 1991, Graff exhibited the series 'Earthworks' at Crane Kalman Gallery, London. Works were made from earth, sand and oil paint, combined and applied to a wooden surface. Graff utilised a restricted palette of greys and earth tones, with the thick layers of "indigenous media" which he intended to be evocative of cave walls. The artist used the cave as a psychological metaphor, stating "I find that the creative process is like an excavation. The artist progressively digs deeper to unearth the fossils of the unconscious".

Graff exhibited later works from the 'Earthworks' series at Fabien Fryns, Gallery, Spain, in 1997, alongside works from the 'Mummification' series. These 'Earthworks' were executed in similar organic, mixed media. 'Traces de Terre', 'Akhenaten's Dream' and 'Moonblood Dance', referenced Paleolithic painting. ".

=== Mummification series ===
From 1988, Graff carried out research on Ancient Egyptian artefacts, travelling to Cairo and Luxor. He also studied at the British Museum's department of Egyptian Antiquities, where he was able to examine a large collection of Ancient Egyptian mummies and funeral relics

Graff exhibited his 'Mummification' series at the New Burlington Gallery, London in 1994, sponsored by the Emerging Art Foundation. The exhibition also included a body of work titled 'Sand Reliefs'. Works were informed by similar concerns to his 1992 photographic exhibition 'Constrictions' at Hamiltons Gallery, London, which included images of string bound meat and sculptural female forms bound with coarse rope. David Cohen reviewed the exhibition in 'Contemporary Art': "His new sculptural works explore similar borderline territory between the animate and the static, the sensual and the morbid."

Some sculptures interpreted the theme of mummification by incorporating personal objects, wrapped and preserved in numerous burnt linen packages and embedded in earth panels, which the artist viewed as resembling tribal burial grounds or rows of Egyptian Shabti figures. "The work relates to both what we can and what we cannot see before us; or more succinctly, it illustrates the theme of memory and repression." (Graff)

=== Constrictions series ===
In 1991 Graff began producing a series of photographic nudes, entitled 'Constrictions' , and later revisited the series in 2013. The images present both male and female bodies as sites for constriction or concealment. They are usually bound with rope. "Following the Surrealists' devotion to ethnography"(Pieroni), Graff was interested in forms of constriction evident in tribal or cultural practices, such as the neck extending rings of the Padaung people of South East Asia, and Chinese foot binding. His photograph 'Rope Head', with the male subject's head completely bound in rope, references artificial cranial deformation. Graff was also influenced by the escapist Houdini, prompting him to photograph a Mongolian contortionist and circus performers. Graff explained in an interview in Australian Magazine 'Black +White', 1995, "...that the figures are naked is very similar to Houdini's performances – he would undress in front of his audience and be tied up. He had to prove there were no hidden tricks."

Graff stated that Man Ray's 'Venus Restaurée' (1936) was a precursor to his series of 'Constrictions'. He was also influenced by the exhibition 'Le Corps en Morceaux' at the Musée d'Orsay, Paris (1990). The critic Caroline Smith observed that Graff was among a number of photographers seeking to question the relationship between art and pornography.

=== Black Box series ===
The 'Black Box' series consists mainly of photorealistic, monochrome oil paintings. They often depict large groups of people or individuals and are derived from found photographs. The 'Black Box' motif painted over the eyes of the subjects has been associated with both "the structures of minimalist nihilism" and censorship in the press. Graff also intended to reference black paintings such as those by Malevich and Reinhart. The theme of concealment in Graff's work can be traced back to his earlier 'Constirictions', as well as his 'Mummification' series; a body of work for which, according to Pieroni, the British Museum's collection of ancient mummies and funeral relics provided an opportunity for "reflecting on the complex relationship between concealment and the sacred".

Among Graff's more conceptual Black Box paintings are those of framed spaces. Within his painting of Freud's office, is a framed mirror which Graff has filled with black paint. This mirror was used to treat agoraphobic patients and has been interpreted as a space where projected fears and desires frequently manifested. In the artwork Louvre 1 (Mona), a crowd of people are gathered around the Mona Lisa, which has been substituted by a black canvas. The image of this black canvas is repeated on the display screens of the crowds' digital cameras. Pieroni reads this photograph as expressing "Too many single-eyed viewers in front of a painting; too much looking, not enough vision".

As of 2006, Graff's Black Box works were concentrated on the theme of the artist's studio; for example, Bacon Studio (Motion Blur) (2006), Studio Floor (2006), Reece Mews Still Life I (2006) and Brancusi Studio (Negative) 2006.

=== Professore ===
In 2008, Graff created a photographic body of work featuring his alter ego 'Professore' as a vehicle to question what he perceived as society's "innate trust in science". The body of work is presented as an apparent archive. 'Professore' is a fictional scientist, who is often depicted performing complex and "absurd" experiments. Working primarily with photography, and also with painting, collage, sculpture, installation, sound and video, Graff created pseudo-scientific conditions within a fictive "laboratory". Graff said in an interview "On the surface, [Professore] appears like a genius, but once scrutinised we can realise that his experiments are nonsensical and likely to end in complete failure!". Graff aimed to treat depictions of 'Professore' with a degree of humour, while presenting him as a character with a quest to expand human knowledge. In 2010 the 'Professore' exhibition took place in the American Hastenasi's Art Gallery's 'Operation Room'; in the same year the series was shown at Assab 1, Milan, in the group exhibition 'Wonderland', curated by James Putnam . A review of a 2012 exhibition at Galerie Odile Ouizeman by Phillipe Dagen appeared in Le Monde, commenting on "allusions to Duchamp, Ernst, and also the cinema of the 1920s and 1960s performance art...". The series was also shown at the Museum of Modern and Contemporary Art (M.A.M.A.C), Nice in 2013, in the exhibition 'La Quatrième Dimension'.

According to Vaitsou, Graff's 'Professore' work is an exploration of identity, its construction, concealment, and breakdown. The body of work also intended to challenge the different ways that society perceives and reacts towards various groups of people. By adopting the role of the eccentric scientist, Graff intended to articulate similarities between artists and scientists in their working methods, for example empirical observation, controlled experimentation, research and trial and error. In his video work 'Experiments in the Phenomena of Existence' (2010), Graff, in the role of 'Professore', directed strangers he encountered in streets, or in Turkish coffee houses (kiraathane), often successfully choreographing "absurd" body articulations and movements, sometimes using pseudo-scientific instruments on members of the public.'Professore' is also seen apparently conducting scientific experiments with the use of his apparatus in the middle a café. Graff claimed "I was curious to see how the public would respond to this figure. 'Professore's unconventional science can range from the fantastic to the banal, but he always treats his experiments with equal reverence so that they come across as plausible".

While Graff's 'Black Box' work presented historic images of groups of artists,; in the 'Professore' series, he became interested in groups of scientists. Hence, there are images of 'Professore' montaged with images of Albert Einstein and Sigmund Freud. The 'Black Box' series also featured paintings of empty studios, such as Bacon's and Brancusi's. "With the 'Professore' work, this idea mutated into images of science laboratories, spaces for experimentation".
