= Palatinate Pearl =

The Palatinate Pearl is a pearl, kept with, but distinct from the Crown Jewels of Bavaria. The pearl is unique insofar as it is one of only very few part black, part white pearls to occur naturally. The pearl is set between two diamond encrusted snakes, protruding from a bed of leaves, flanked by two flowers. While the exact origins of the pearl are unknown it first appears among the royal Crown Jewels of Bavaria, who were the ruling family of the Palatinate, which gave its name to the pearl (and possibly its origin). Having traveled with its various royal owners from castle to castle, the pearl arrived in Munich in the late eighteenth century with its owner at the time, the Elector Palatine Charles Theodore, having ascended to the title of elector of Bavaria, after the extinction of the junior Bavarian branch of his family.
