= King of Bavaria =

Monarch of the Kingdom of Bavaria (1805–1918)

- König von Bayern
- Royal coat of arms

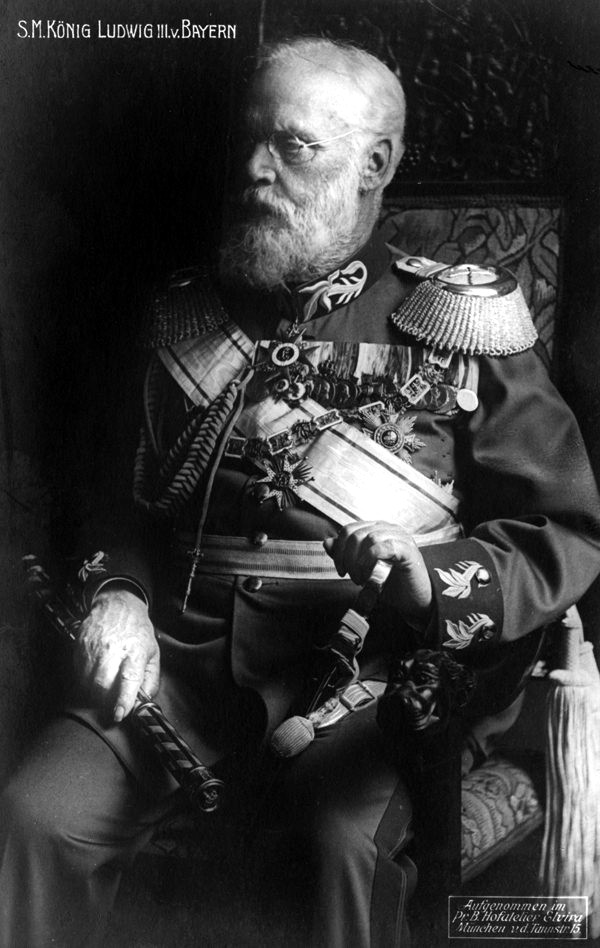
- Last to reign: Ludwig III; 1913 – 1918

Details
- Style: His Majesty
- First monarch: Maximilian I
- Last monarch: Ludwig III
- Formed: 1806
- Abolished: 1918
- Appointer: Hereditary
- Pretender: Franz, Duke of Bavaria

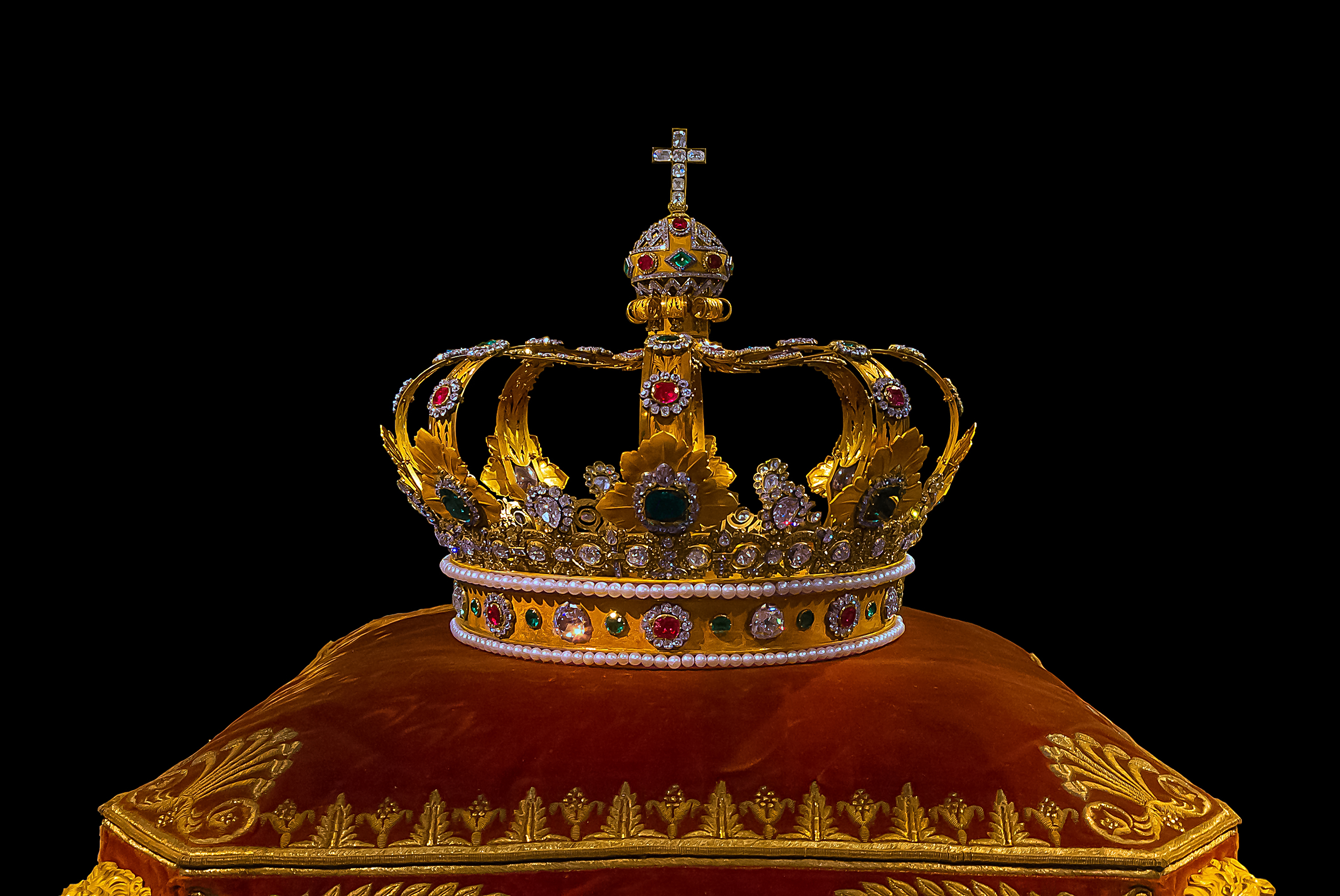
The Crown of Bavaria.

The King of Bavaria (German: König von Bayern) was a title held by the hereditary Wittelsbach rulers of Bavaria in the state known as the Kingdom of Bavaria from 1805 until 1918, when the kingdom was abolished. It was the second time Bavaria was a kingdom, almost a thousand years after the short-lived Carolingian kingdom of Bavaria.

== History ==
Royal Standard of the King of Bavaria (1835–1914)

Under the terms of the Treaty of Pressburg concluded 26 December 1805 between French Emperor Napoleon and Holy Roman Emperor Francis II, several principalities allied to Napoleon were elevated to kingdoms. One of the staunchest of these had been the prince-elector of Bavaria, Maximilian IV Joseph, and on 1 January 1806, he assumed formally the title King Maximilian I Joseph of Bavaria. He was a member of the Wittelsbach branch Palatinate-Birkenfeld-Zweibrücken.

Maximilian's successors resisted German nationalism, and Bavaria became the protector of smaller states whose leaders felt threatened by Prussia or Austria in the German Confederation. Religious ties and the Upper German language linked the state more to Austria until their defeat in the Austro-Prussian War. King Ludwig II signed an alliance with Prussia on 22 August 1866, effectively relinquishing Bavarian independence.

With the treaty of 23 November 1870 Bavaria was integrated into the new German Empire, but permitted a relatively large degree of self-determination. The Kings of Bavaria maintained their titles, and maintained separate diplomatic and military corps. When the German Empire was abolished in November 1918 after the end of World War I, the last king of Bavaria, Ludwig III, was deposed.

== Kings of Bavaria ==
- Maximilian I Joseph 1805–1825
- Ludwig I 1825–1848 (d. 1868)
- Maximilian II 1848–1864
- Ludwig II 1864–1886
- Otto 1886–1913 (d. 1916)
  - Prince Luitpold of Bavaria, Regent 1886–1912
  - Prince Ludwig of Bavaria, Regent 1912–1913
- Ludwig III 1913–1918

The title King of Bavaria is sometimes used in reference to Carolingian kings ruling over Bavaria. See List of monarchs of Bavaria for these.

=== List of kings ===
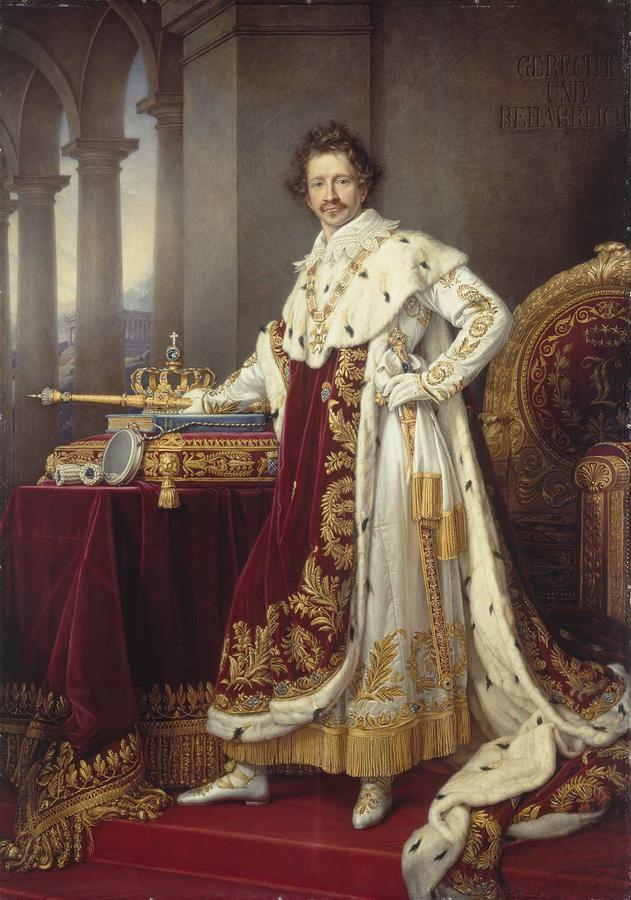
Portrait of Ludwig I of Bavaria by Joseph Karl Stieler, 1826. Ludwig reigned from 1825 until he was overthrown in the Revolution of 1848

Name	Portrait	Title	Reign start	Reign end	House	Official title	Note
Maximilian I Joseph	Maximillian I Joseph	Elector of the Palatinate; King of Bavaria	1799	1825	Wittelsbach	His Majesty Maximilian Joseph, King of Bavaria	Son of Count Palatine Frederick Michael of Zweibrücken. Distant cousin of his predecessor Elector Charles Theodore; Count Palatine of Zweibrücken from 1795. In the chaos of the wars of the French Revolution, the old order of the Holy Roman Empire collapsed. In the course of these events, Bavaria once again became an ally of France, and Maximilian IV Joseph abandoned his Electoral title — as there would soon be no Emperor to elect — for the title of King of Bavaria, becoming Maximilian I Joseph on 1 January 1806.
Ludwig I	Ludwig I	King of Bavaria	1825	1848	Wittelsbach	His Majesty Ludwig, King of Bavaria, Duke of Franconia and in Swabia, Count Palatine of the Rhine.	Son of Maximilian I Joseph. Abdicated in the Revolutions of 1848.
Maximilian II Joseph	Maximillian II Joseph	King of Bavaria	1848	1864	Wittelsbach	His Majesty Maximilian, King of Bavaria, Duke of Franconia and in Swabia, Count Palatine of the Rhine.	Son of Ludwig I.
Ludwig II	Ludwig II	King of Bavaria	1864	1886	Wittelsbach	His Majesty Ludwig, King of Bavaria, Duke of Franconia and in Swabia, Count Palatine of the Rhine.	Son of Maximilian II Joseph. Ludwig II was called the Märchenkönig (fairy-tale king). He acceded to Bavaria becoming a state of the German Empire in 1871, he was declared insane in 1886.
Otto I	Otto	King of Bavaria	1886	1913	Wittelsbach	His Majesty Otto, King of Bavaria, Duke of Franconia and in Swabia, Count Palatine of the Rhine.	Son of Maximilian II Joseph. Otto was mentally ill throughout his reign, and his functions were carried out by the following prince regents: Prince Luitpold of Bavaria 1886–1912; Prince Ludwig of Bavaria 1912—1913
Luitpold	Luitpold	Prince Regent of Bavaria	1886	1912	Wittelsbach	His Royal Highness Luitpold, Prince Regent of Bavaria, Duke of Bavaria, of Franconia and in Swabia, Count Palatine of the Rhine.	Son of Ludwig I, Prince Regent of Bavaria for kings Ludwig II and Otto.
Ludwig III	Ludwig III	Prince Regent of Bavaria; King of Bavaria	1913	1918	Wittelsbach	His Majesty Ludwig, King of Bavaria, Duke of Franconia and in Swabia, Count Palatine of the Rhine.	Son of Prince Regent Luitpold and grandson of Ludwig I. Prince Regent from 1912 until 1913, then King of Bavaria, he lost his throne in the German Revolution at the end of World War I.

== Current heir ==
Franz Bonaventura Adalbert Maria Herzog von Bayern (born 14 July 1933), styled His Royal Highness The Duke of Bavaria, is head of the Wittelsbach family, the former ruling family of the Kingdom of Bavaria.

The succession to the headship of the family is determined by Article 2 of Title 2 of the 1818 Constitution of the Kingdom of Bavaria, which states, "The crown is hereditary among the male descendants of the royal house according to the law of primogeniture and the agnatic lineal succession." The succession is further clarified by Title 5 of the Bavarian Royal Family Statute of 1819.

In 1948 and 1949 Crown Prince Rupprecht, with the agreement of the other members of the house, amended the house laws to allow the succession of the sons of princes who had married into comital houses. In 1999 Duke Franz, with the agreement of the other members of the house, amended the house laws further to allow the succession of the sons of any princes who married with the permission of the head of the house.

Franz has never married. The heir presumptive to the headship of the House of Wittelsbach is his brother Prince Max, Duke in Bavaria. Because Max has five daughters but no sons, he is followed in the line of succession by his and Franz's first cousin (and second cousin in the male line) Prince Luitpold.

The current line of succession to the headship of the family is:

- Ludwig I of Bavaria (1786–1868)
  - Luitpold, Prince Regent of Bavaria (1821–1912)
    - Ludwig III of Bavaria (1845–1921)
      - Rupprecht, Crown Prince of Bavaria (1869–1955)
        - Albrecht, Duke of Bavaria (1905–1996)
          - Franz, The Duke of Bavaria (born 1933)
          - (1) Prince Max of Bavaria, Duke in Bavaria (born 1937)
      - Prince Franz of Bavaria (1875–1957)
        - Prince Ludwig of Bavaria (1913–2008)
          - (2) Prince Luitpold of Bavaria (born 1951)
            - (3) Prince Ludwig of Bavaria (born 1982)
            - (4) Prince Heinrich of Bavaria (born 1986)
            - (5) Prince Karl of Bavaria (born 1987)
        - Prince Rasso of Bavaria (1926–2011)
          - (6) Prince Wolfgang of Bavaria (born 1960)
            - (7) Prince Tassilo of Bavaria (born 1992)
            - (8) Prince Richard of Bavaria (born 1993)
            - (9) Prince Philipp of Bavaria (born 1996)
          - (10) Prince Christoph of Bavaria (born 1962)
            - (11) Prince Corbinian of Bavaria (born 1996)
            - (12) Prince Stanislaus of Bavaria (born 1997)
            - (13) Prince Marcello of Bavaria (born 1998)
  - Prince Adalbert of Bavaria (1828–1875)
    - Prince Ludwig Ferdinand of Bavaria (1859–1949)
      - Prince Adalbert of Bavaria (1886–1970)
        - Prince Konstantin of Bavaria (1920–1969)
          - (14) Prince Leopold of Bavaria (born 1943) - current heir to Otto I, King of Greece (Leopold's eldest son Prince Manuel of Bavaria was born out of wedlock and is not in the line of succession)
            - (15) Prince Konstantin of Bavaria (born 1986)
          - (16) Prince Adalbert of Bavaria (born 1944)
            - (17) Prince Hubertus of Bavaria (born 1989)

== See also ==
- List of rulers of Bavaria
- History of Bavaria
