= Crown of Bavaria =

Part of the Bavarian Crown Jewels

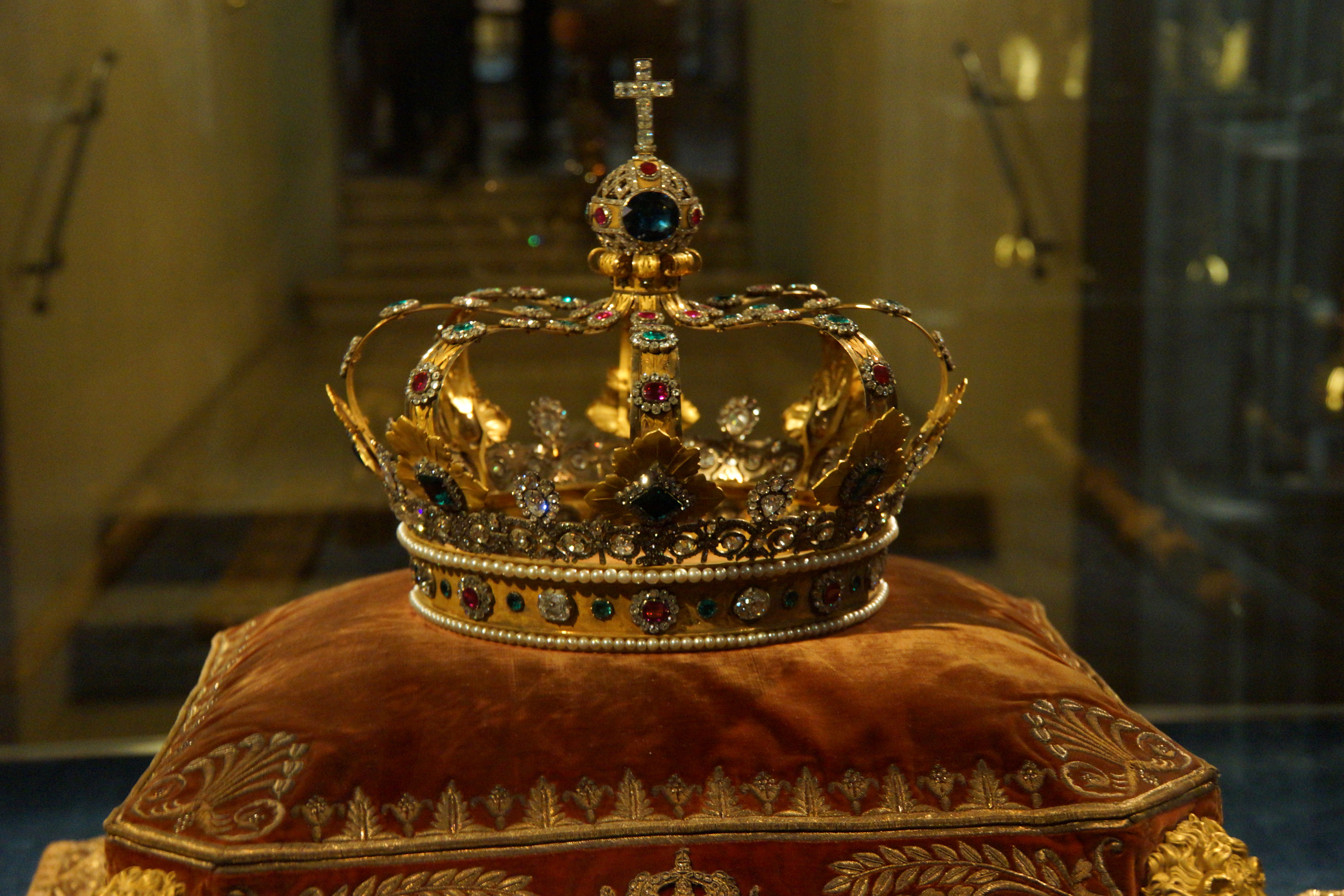

Heraldic depictions

Details
- Country: Germany
- Made: 1806
- Arches: 8
- Material: Gold
- Notable stones: Pearls, diamonds, emeralds, sapphires, rubies
- Other elements: Diamond Wittelsbach

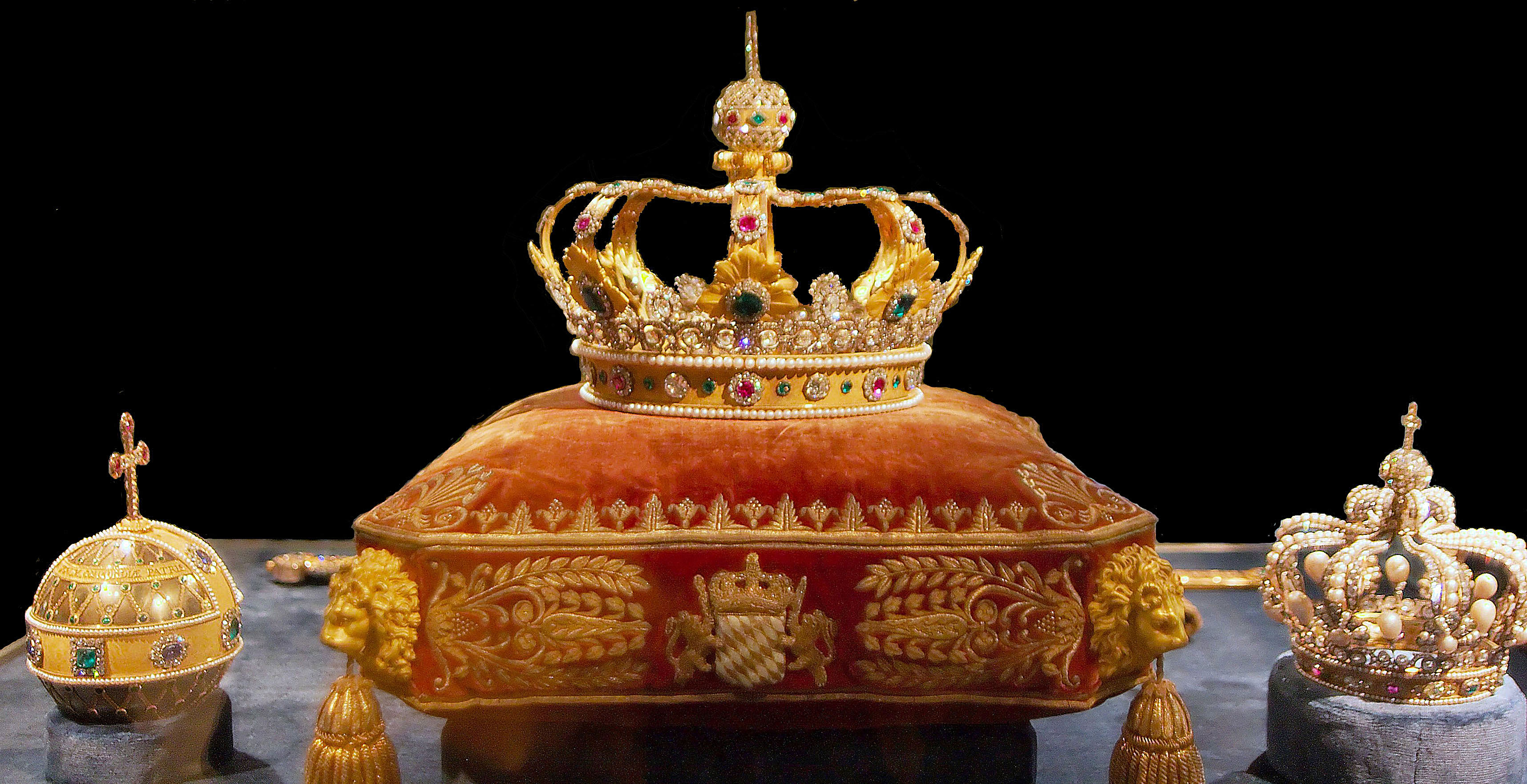
Crown of Bavaria

The Crown of the King of Bavaria is a part of the Bavarian Crown Jewels.

In 1806 Napoleon raised Bavaria to kingdom status, Maximilian I ordered the crown and the regalia which can be seen today in the Treasury at the Residenz in Munich. Drawing on inspirations from the Crown of Louis XV of France, the French goldsmith Jean-Baptiste de Lasne designed the crown.

Maximilian's royal title and vast increase in territory came as part of his alliance with Emperor Napoleon at the Treaty of Pressburg (1805). Making Maximilian a chief member of the Confederation of the Rhine. Maximilian further enhanced his relationship with Napoleon in 1813, when his eldest daughter, Princess Augusta of Bavaria married Napoleon's stepson, Eugène de Beauharnais.

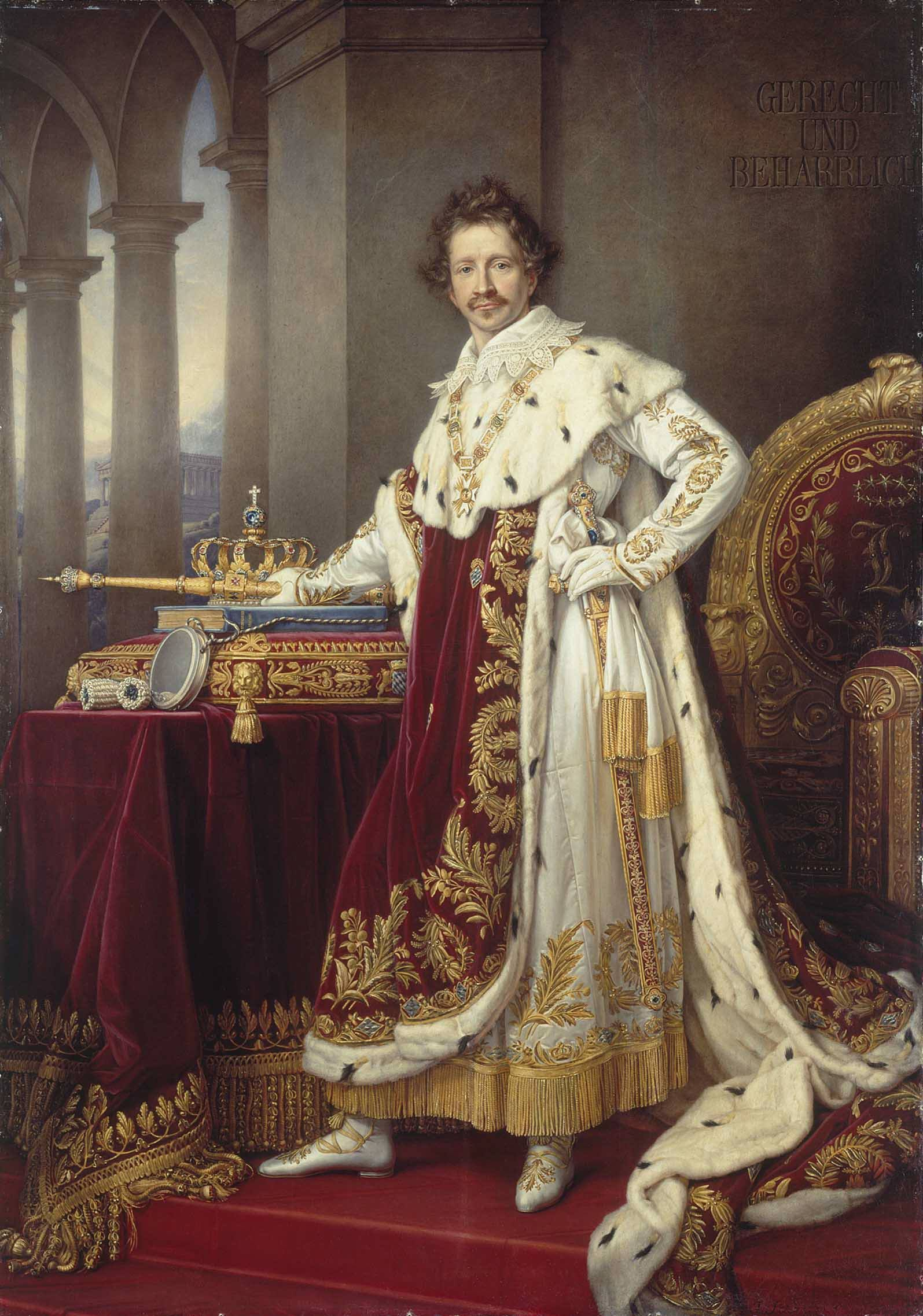
Portrait of Ludwig I by Joseph Karl Stieler, 1826. The Bavarian Crown is displayed on the left of the painting.

Made by Biennais, the most famous French goldsmith of the day, the Royal Crown of Bavaria is set with rubies, diamonds, emeralds, sapphires and pearls. In 1931 the Wittelsbach family removed and sold the Wittelsbach Diamond

The crown was placed on a cushion for royal ceremonies, but was never worn by the royal sovereign.
