= Portrait of Amalie Auguste of Bavaria =

Painting by Joseph Karl Stieler

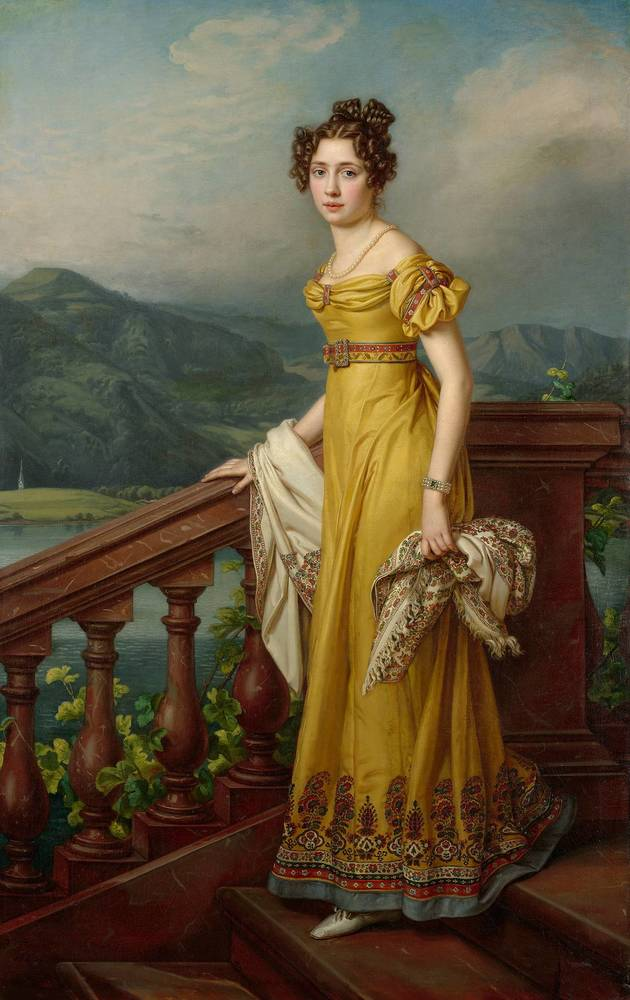
- Artist: Joseph Karl Stieler
- Year: 1823
- Type: Oil on canvas, portrait
- Dimensions: 203 cm × 133 cm (80 in × 52 in)
- Location: Galerie Neue Meister, Dresden

Portrait of Amalie Auguste of Bavaria is an oil on canvas portrait painting by the German artist Joseph Karl Stieler, from 1823. It is held at the Staatliche Kunstsammlungen Dresden, at the Galerie Neue Meister, in Dresden.

== History and description ==
It is a depiction of Princess Amalie Auguste of Bavaria. Stieler had been the court painter to her father Maximilian, King of Bavaria, since 1820.

The Princess is shown wearing a yellow dress in the Empire silhouette style. She is shown standing on a staircase of a veranda with the Lake Tegernsee behind her, while she looks at the viewer. In the background, we can see some mountains and a cloudy sky. Since 1817, Tegernsee Castle had been the summer residence of the Bavarian royal family, and Maximilian met Tsar Alexander and Emperor Francis there before the Congress of Verona.

This work was likely commissioned to celebrate the wedding of Amalie Auguste and John of Saxony, held on 21 November 1822, in Saxony. Amalie Auguste's husband succeeded to the throne as King of Saxony in 1854 and she became queen consort.

== Bibliography ==
- Klaus-Diete, Wintermann & John, Uwe. König Johann von Sachsen: zwischen zwei Welten. J. Stekovics, 2001.
- Nöhbauer, Hans F. Munich, City of the Arts. Hirmer, 1994.
- Von Hase-Schmundt, Ulrike. Joseph Stieler, 1781–1858: Sein Leben u. sein Werk. Krit. Verzeichnis d. Werke. Prestel, 1971.
