= Laurence Graff =

English businessman and jeweller

Laurence Graff OBE
- Born: 13 June 1938 (age 88); Stepney, London
- Occupations: Businessman and jeweller
- Years active: 1953–present
- Spouse: Anne-Marie Graff (divorced)
- Children: 5

Laurence Graff OBE (born 13 June 1938) is an English jeweller and billionaire businessman, best known as the founder of Graff Diamonds, supplier of jewellery and jewels.

== Early life ==
Graff was born in Stepney in 1938 into a Jewish family, the son of a Romanian mother, Rebecca Segal, and a Russian father, Harry Graff.

== Career ==
Encouraging her son to learn a trade, Graff's mother enrolled him onto a jewellery manufacturing workshop in London, and he left school at 14 to become an apprentice. He soon went into partnership with Schindler, a jeweller, repairing rings and creating small pieces of jewellery in a small shop. That shop went out of business and so Graff began selling his jewellery designs independently to jewellers all over England. By 1962, he had two jewellery shops, including his first in Hatton Garden.

In 1960, he founded the Graff Diamonds company. In 1966 he commissioned the English jewellery-designer Robert Thomas to design a diamond jewel to enter into the De Beers Diamond International Awards competition. The ribbon bracelet he created won the competition. By 1974, he had begun specialising in selling to newly rich buyers from the Middle East. In particular, he supplied many jewels for Hassanal Bolkiah, the 29th Sultan of Brunei, who became a lifelong client and friend. One day, Prince Turki II bin Abdulaziz Al Saud walked into the shop and bought everything including a 14 carat diamond. Graff has expanded his company, with over 35 shops in Africa, Asia, Europe, the Middle East and the US.

According to the Sunday Times Rich List 2020, Graff and his son Francois had a combined personal net worth of £3.785 billion.

=== Re-cut of the Wittelsbach Diamond ===
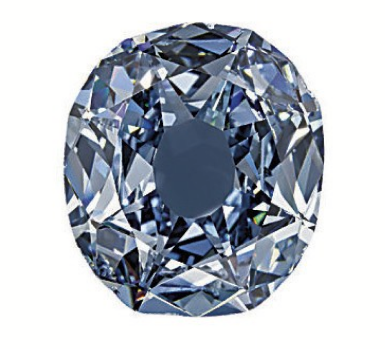
The Wittelsbach diamond before being recut

In 2008, Graff purchased the Wittelsbach Diamond for £16.4 million, a considerable premium over the £9 million guide price. Almost two years later, Graff revealed he had had three diamond cutters repolish the stone to eliminate the chips and improve the clarity, reducing the diamond from 35.52 carats (7.104 g) to 31 carats (6.2 g). This action has been compared by critics to making the Mona Lisa prettier. However, according to gemologist Richard W. Wise, "At a cost of only 4.45 carats the recut and renamed Wittelsbach-Graff Diamond has been raised from a GIA grade of Fancy Deep Grayish Blue to a Fancy Deep Blue. Its clarity grade has been likewise elevated from VS2 to Internally Flawless (IF). This is a substantial upgrade." Further, the "Graff recut retained the original double stellate brilliant facet pattern thus retaining the overall look of the original stone."

== Personal life ==
In 1962, Graff married Anne-Marie, who is French. They later divorced and his ex-wife is now credited as Anne-Marie Graff Ali. Together they had three children, two sons and a daughter (François Xavier, Kristelle and Stephane). His son, Francois Xavier Graff is the chief executive of the family business.

Graff holds a 60% stake in the business through Graff Diamonds Corp., a Cayman Islands-based holding company. The remainder is held in the name of his ex-wife, Anne-Marie. Graff is credited with her stake because he controls the company's operational and strategic decisions and founded the company.

Graff has five children, and lives in Gstaad, Switzerland. He is an art collector, his earlier interest was paintings of impressionism, and later contemporary art. Graff purchased Andy Warhol’s 'Liz' for $12.6 million.

== Honours ==
Graff was appointed Officer of the Order of the British Empire (OBE) in the 2013 Birthday Honours for services to the jewellery industry.
