= Bavarian Crown Jewels =

Bavarian royal regalia

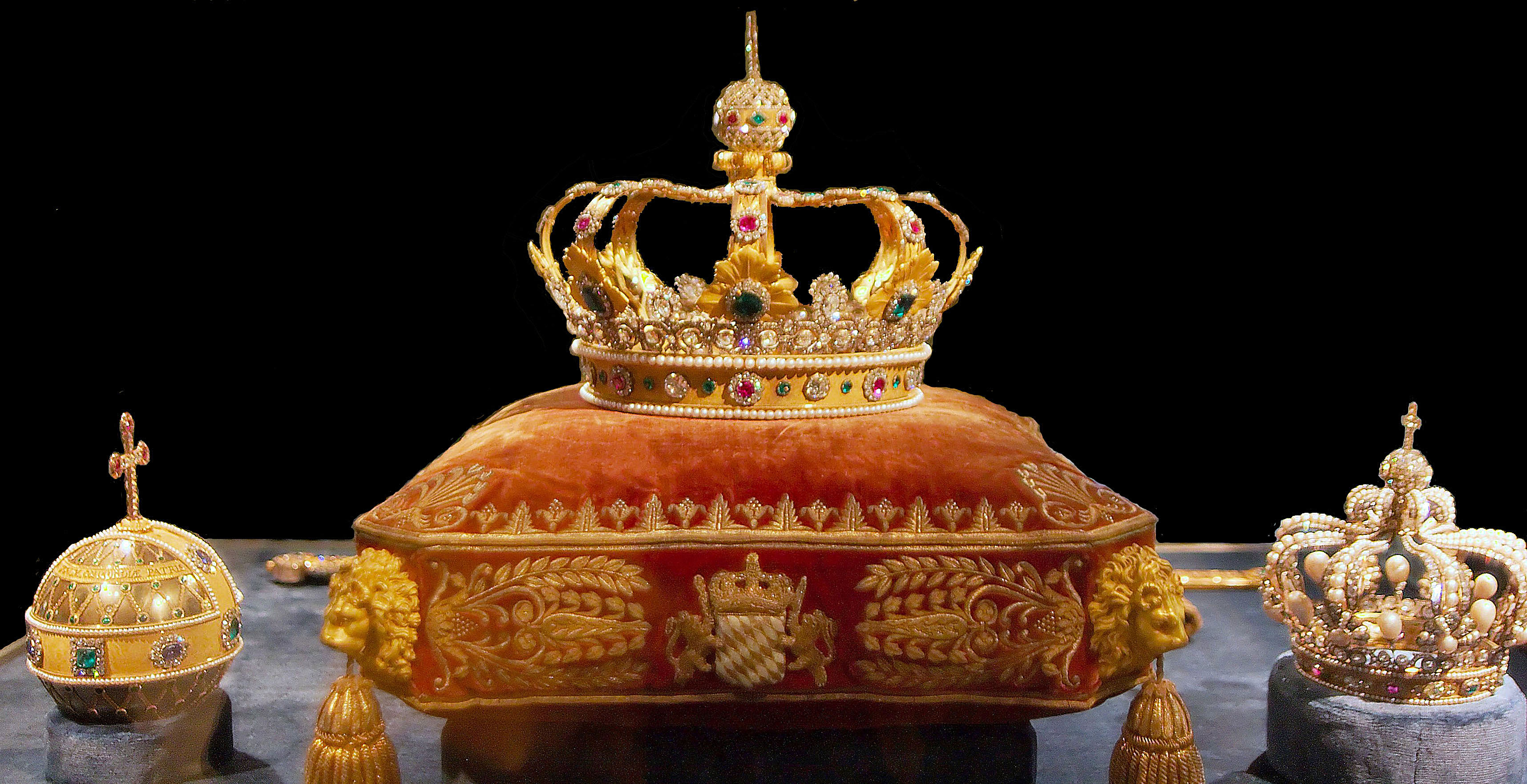
Bavarian King's Crown

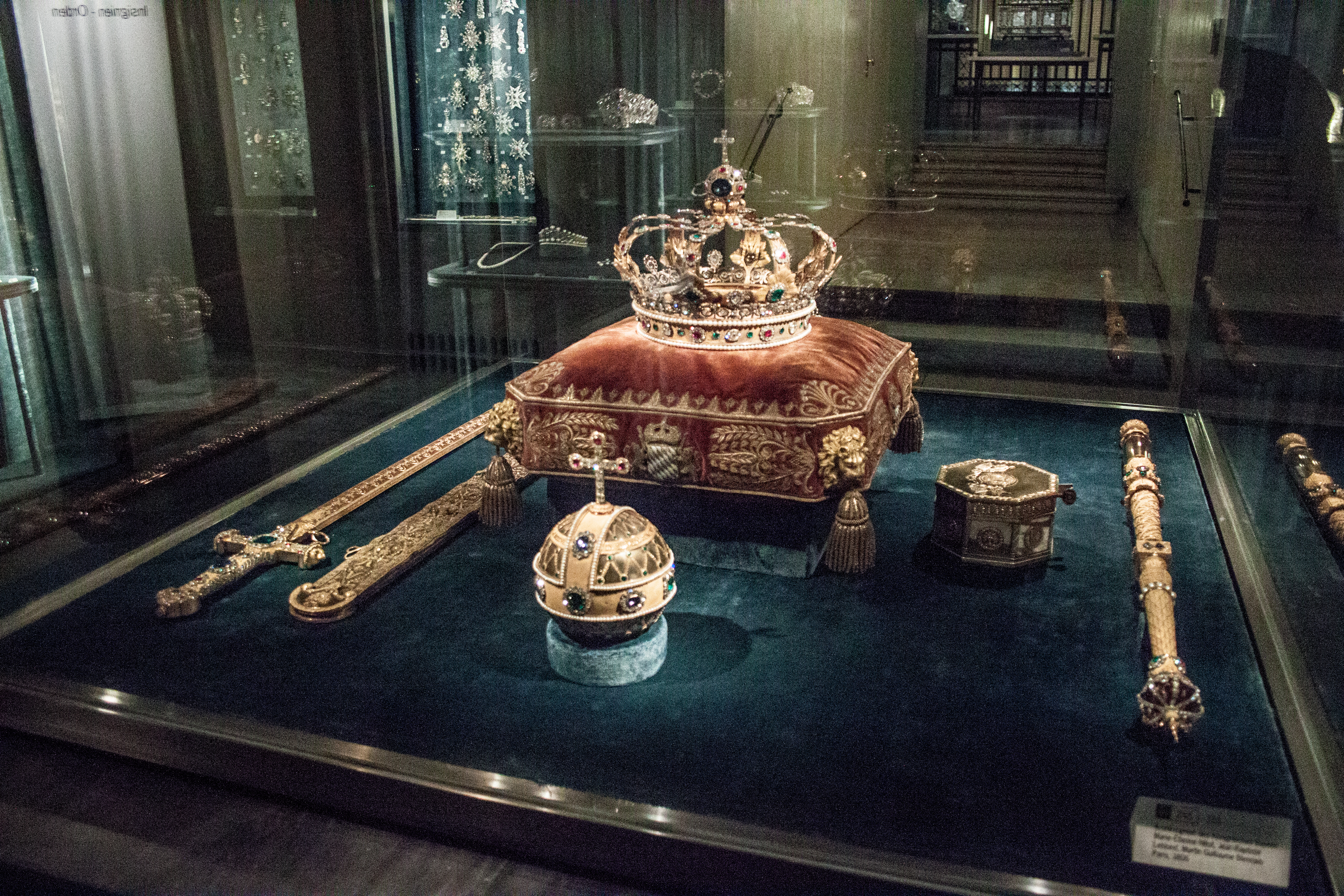
Royal regalia of Bavaria

The Bavarian Crown Jewels are a set of crown jewels created for the Kingdom of Bavaria, which existed from 1806 to 1918. In 1806, as part of his wholescale re-ordering of the map of Europe, Emperor Napoléon I of the French upgraded the independent German duchy of Bavaria to full kingdom status. The former Duke of Bavaria, now King of Bavaria, Maximilian I, commemorated the fact by commissioning a set of crown jewels for use by Bavarian monarchs. However, there was no coronation ceremony, and the king never wore the crown in public. Rather, it was placed on a cushion when displayed on occasions such as the king's ascension or his funeral.

Included in the regalia were:

- The Crown of Bavaria – the King's crown, which was set with rubies, diamonds, emeralds, sapphires and pearls;
- the Crown of the Queens of Bavaria, which was made for the then queen, Karoline of Baden, and which contains huge pearls and large diamonds;
- The 96 centimetre long State Sword;
- The Royal Orb – made of gold;
- The 89 centimetre long Royal Sceptre set with brilliants, emeralds and sapphires and the top is surmounted by a small round crown.

The Palatinate Pearl is also kept with the crown jewels, however it is not officially part of the collection. As a result of the First World War, the German monarchies were abolished in 1918 and since then, Bavaria has not had a monarch. The Bavarian Crown Jewels are currently on display in the Treasury of the Residenz palace in Munich.
