= Joseph Karl Stieler =

German painter (1781–1858)

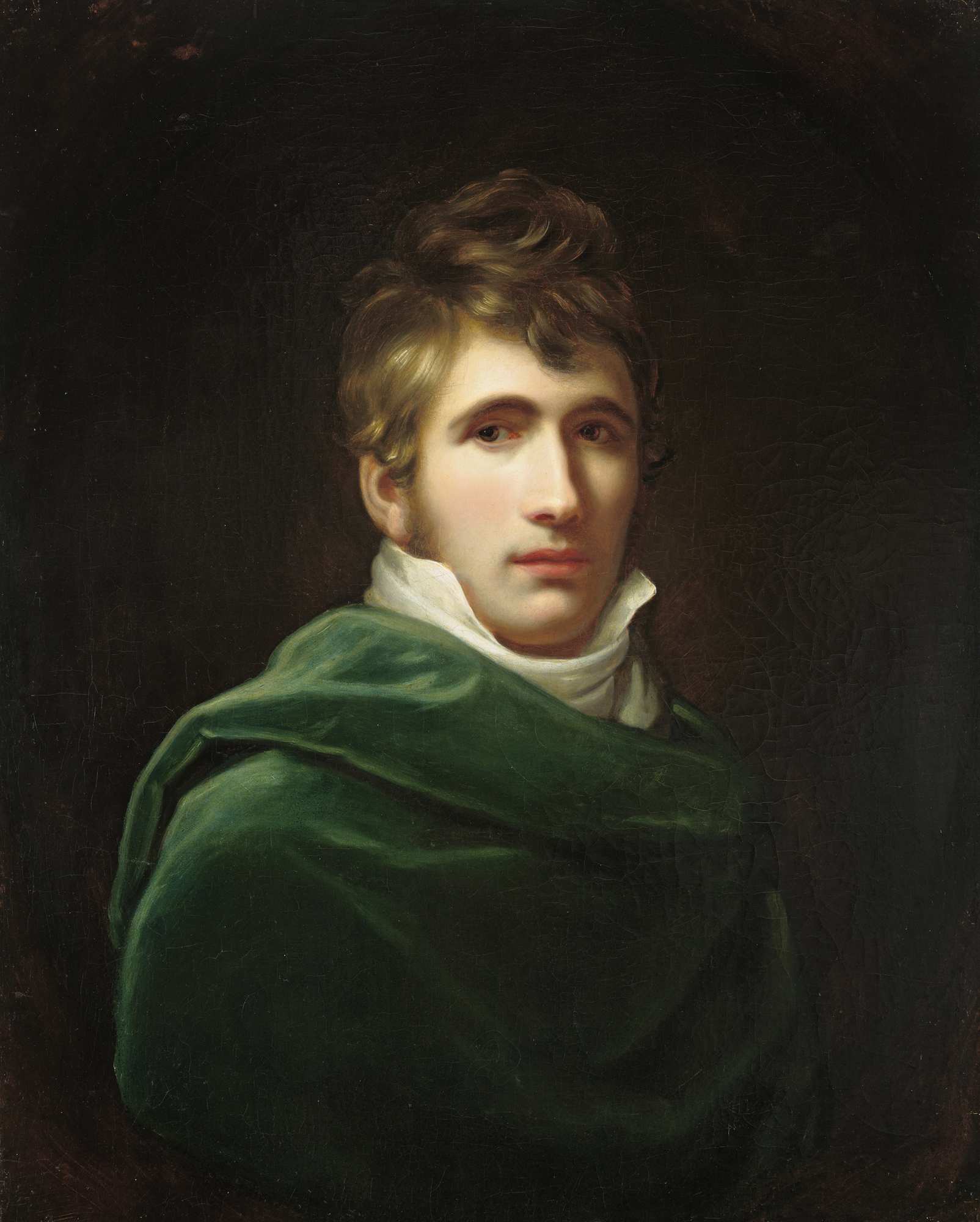
- Self-portrait, 1806
- Born: 1 November 1781; Mainz, Electorate of Mainz, Holy Roman Empire
- Died: 9 April 1858 (aged 76); Munich, Kingdom of Bavaria, German Confederation
- Known for: Portrait painting
- Notable work: Beethoven with the Manuscript of the Missa Solemnis, 1820
- Spouses: Pauline Luise Beckers (m. 1818; died 1830) Josephine von Miller (m. 1833)
- Children: 8, including Karl
- Parents: August Friedrich Stieler (father); Philippine Fritzmann (mother)

Joseph Karl Stieler (1 November 1781 – 9 April 1858) was a German painter. From 1820 until 1855 he worked as royal court painter for the Bavarian kings. He is known for his Neoclassical portraits, especially for the Gallery of Beauties at Nymphenburg Palace in Munich, as well as his emblematic portrait of Ludwig van Beethoven, which has become one of his most famous works.

== Life ==
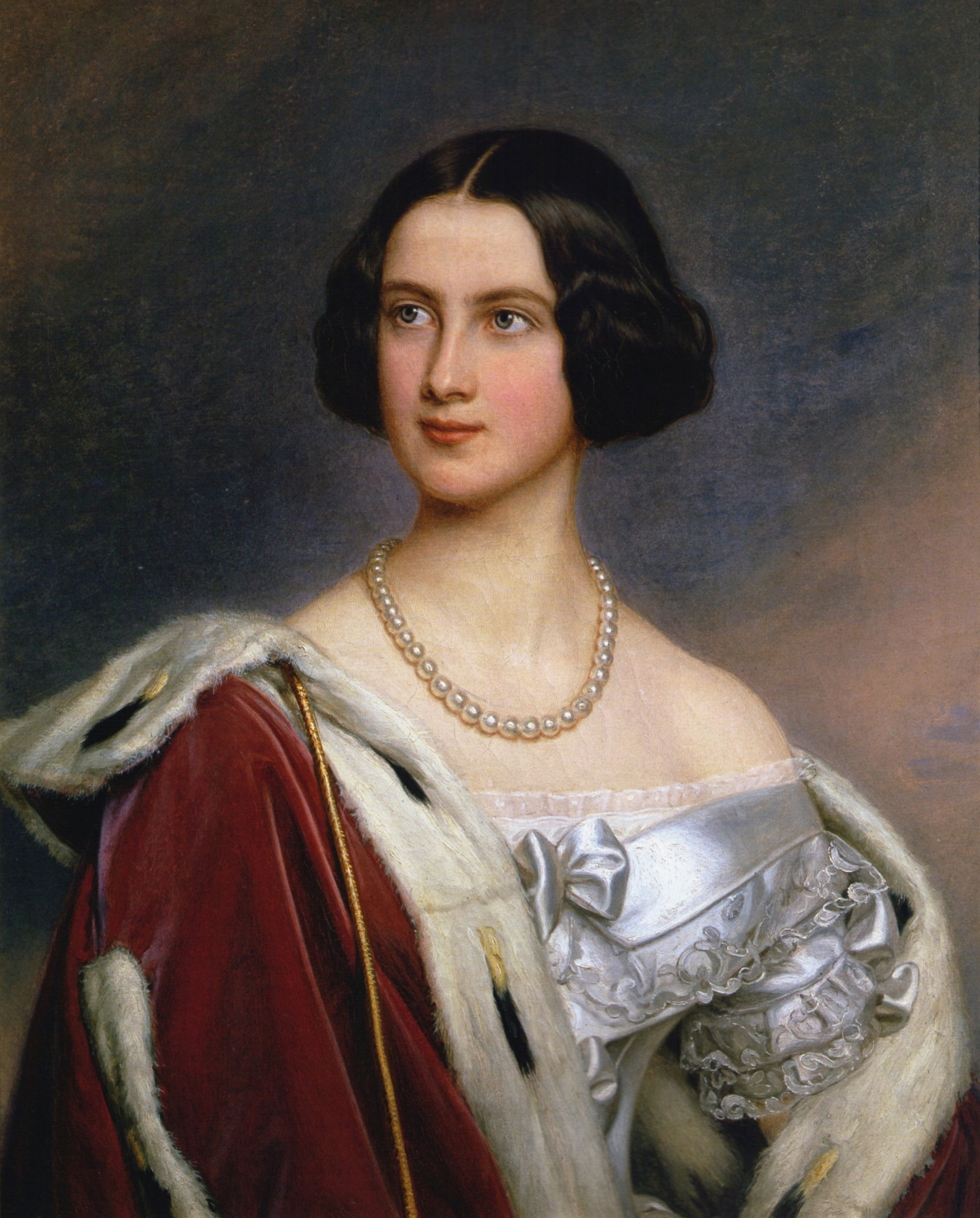
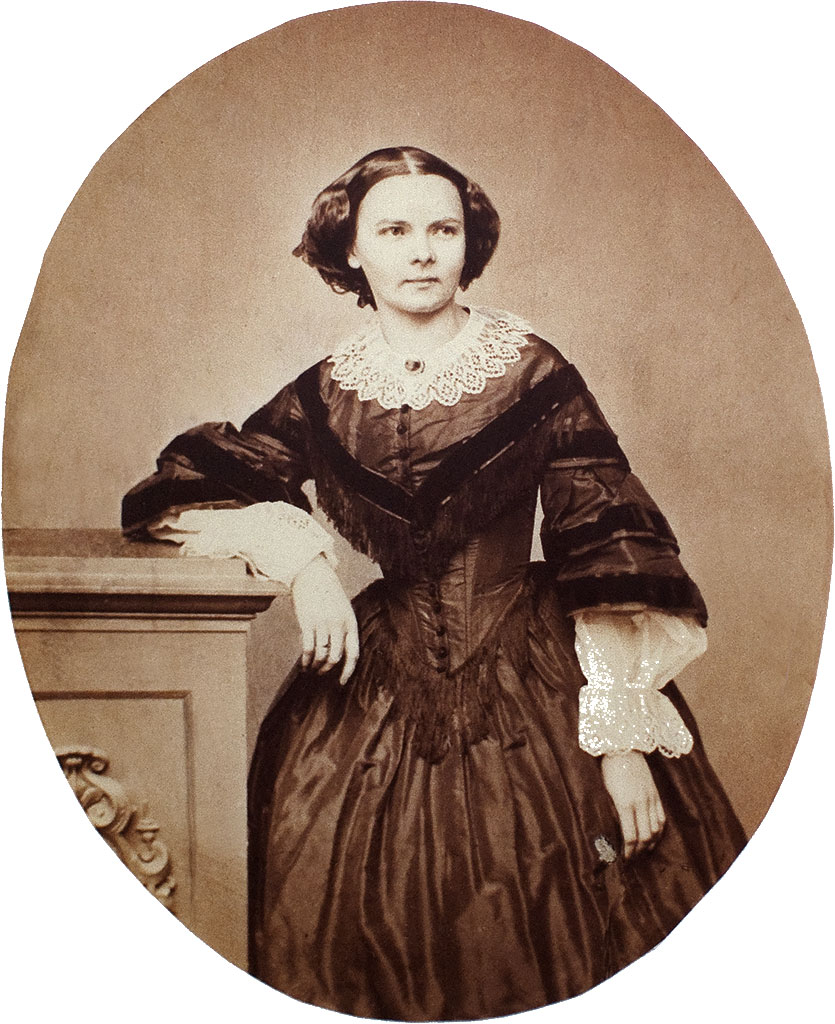
Stieler beautified his models, see Marie of Prussia Queen of Bavaria, photo (1855) and painting (1843)

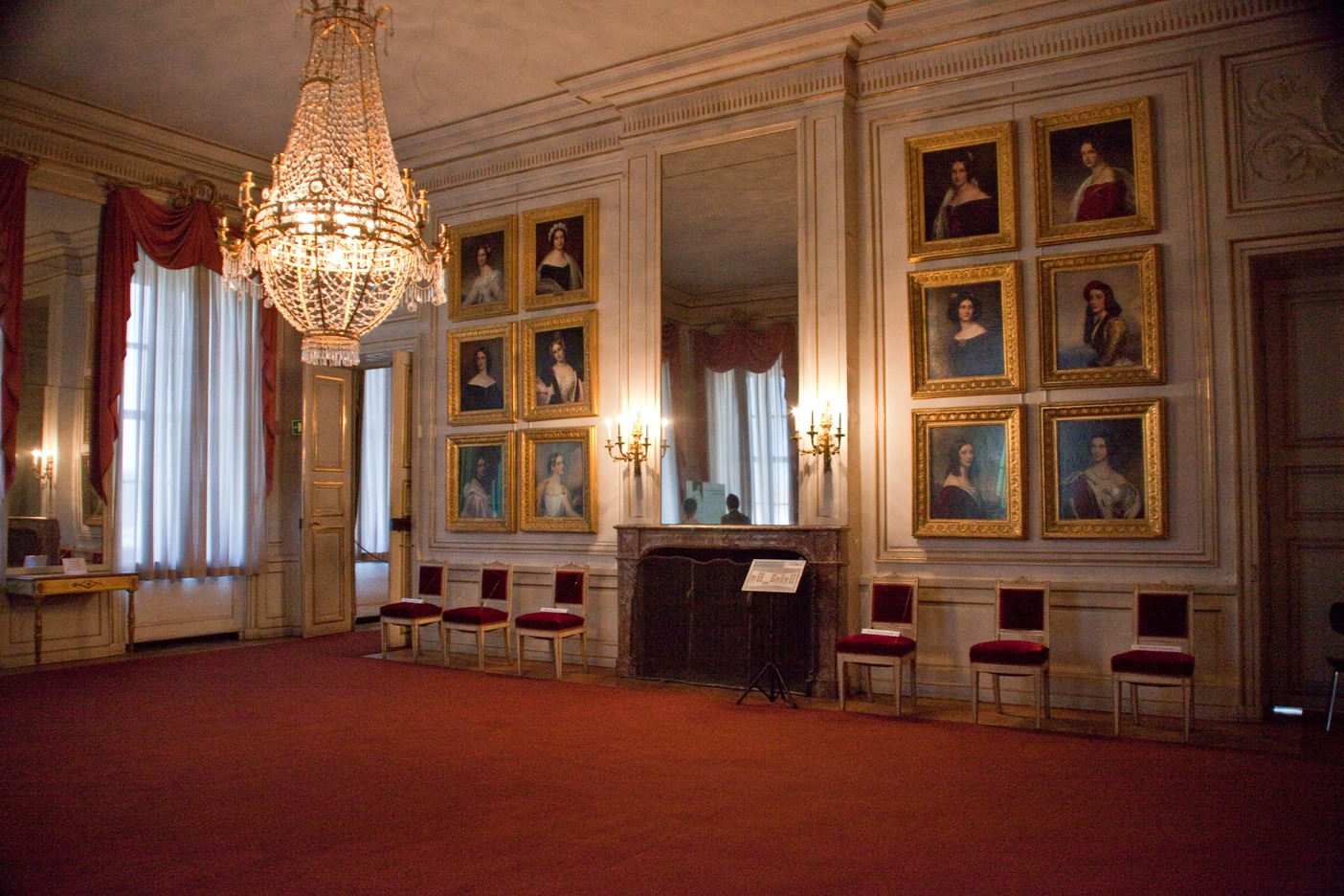
Gallery of Beauties, Nymphenburg

Born in the city of Mainz to a long-established family of engravers, punchcutters and die makers, Stieler received some artistic training from his father, August Friedrich Stieler (1736–1789). After the early death of his father, Joseph Karl autodidactically completed his apprenticeship and began his career as a painter of miniatures, which were increasingly sought after by bourgeois circles. After Mainz had been occupied by French revolutionary troops in 1792, Stieler followed the expelled court of Prince-Archbishop Friedrich Karl Joseph von Erthal to Aschaffenburg. Here he met with the later Archbishop Karl Theodor Anton Maria von Dalberg, who became his most important patron and sponsor.

From 1802 to 1805 he attended the Academy of Fine Arts Vienna in the master class of Heinrich Füger. Stieler's portrait style was most especially shaped during his work in the Parisian atelier of François Gérard, a student of Jacques-Louis David. In 1808, he established himself as an independent portraitist in the city of Frankfurt and in 1810 travelled through Italy. From 1812 he worked at the court of King Maximilian I Joseph of Bavaria.

In 1816, he again travelled to Vienna to paint the portrait of Emperor Francis I of Austria. Between February and April 1820, he worked on his portrait of Ludwig van Beethoven, which is probably the most well-known representation of the composer today. In 1847 he also painted the portrait of Lola Montez, whose affair with King Ludwig I of Bavaria led to the monarch's abdication the next year.

Stieler retired in 1855 to live at his country home in Tegernsee. He died in Munich three years later. His son Karl Stieler (1842–1885) became a well-known writer.

== Work ==
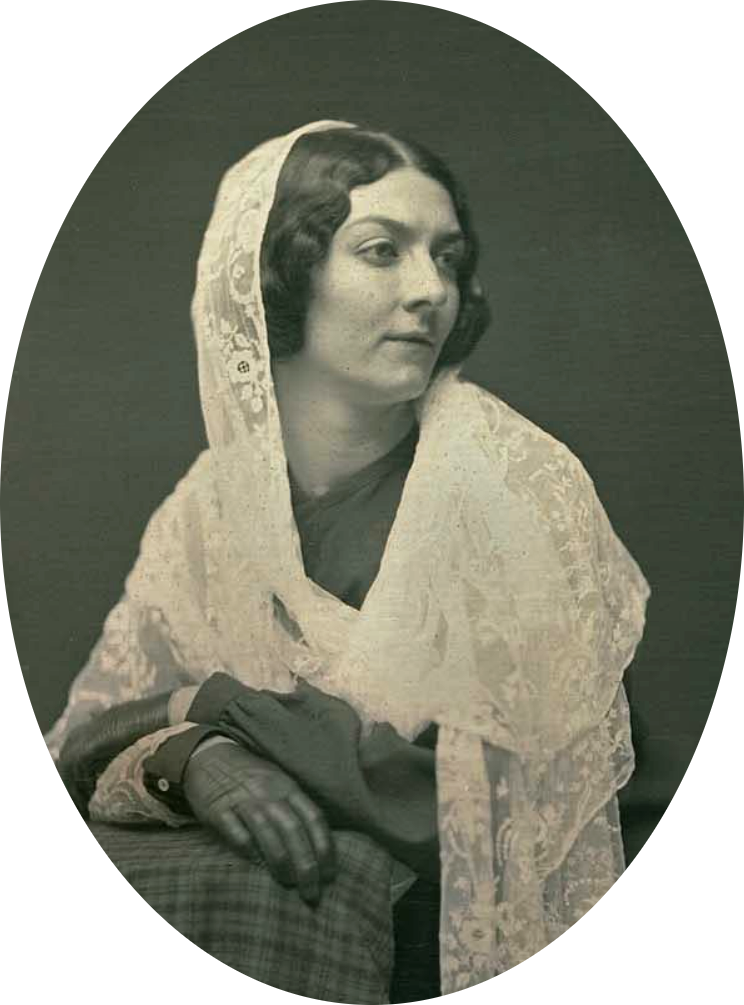
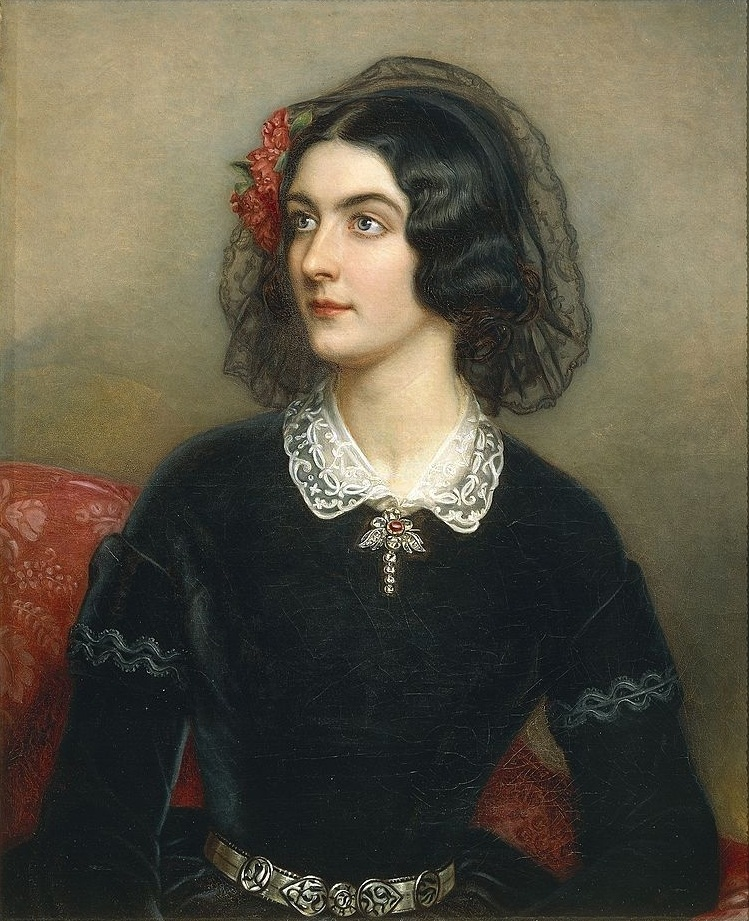
Lola Montez, photo (1851) and painting (1847)

Stieler worked mainly in the service of the Bavarian court. His painted likenesses in Schloss Nymphenburg, the Schönheitengalerie, the so-called Gallery of Beauties, were commissioned by King Ludwig I of Bavaria. Stieler painted the portraits of Ludwig van Beethoven, Johann Wolfgang von Goethe, Madame Mère (Letizia Ramolino Bonaparte), Amalia of Greece, Friedrich Wilhelm Joseph von Schelling, Johann Ludwig Tieck, and Alexander von Humboldt, but also altarpieces.

The most distinguishing feature of Stieler's portraits is his utter focus on the sitter. Decorative additions are left out, and there is nothing that distracts the viewer's scrutiny. Stieler accomplished this concentration through deliberate light and dark contrast, which above all highlights the accurately characterized facial features.

== Gallery ==
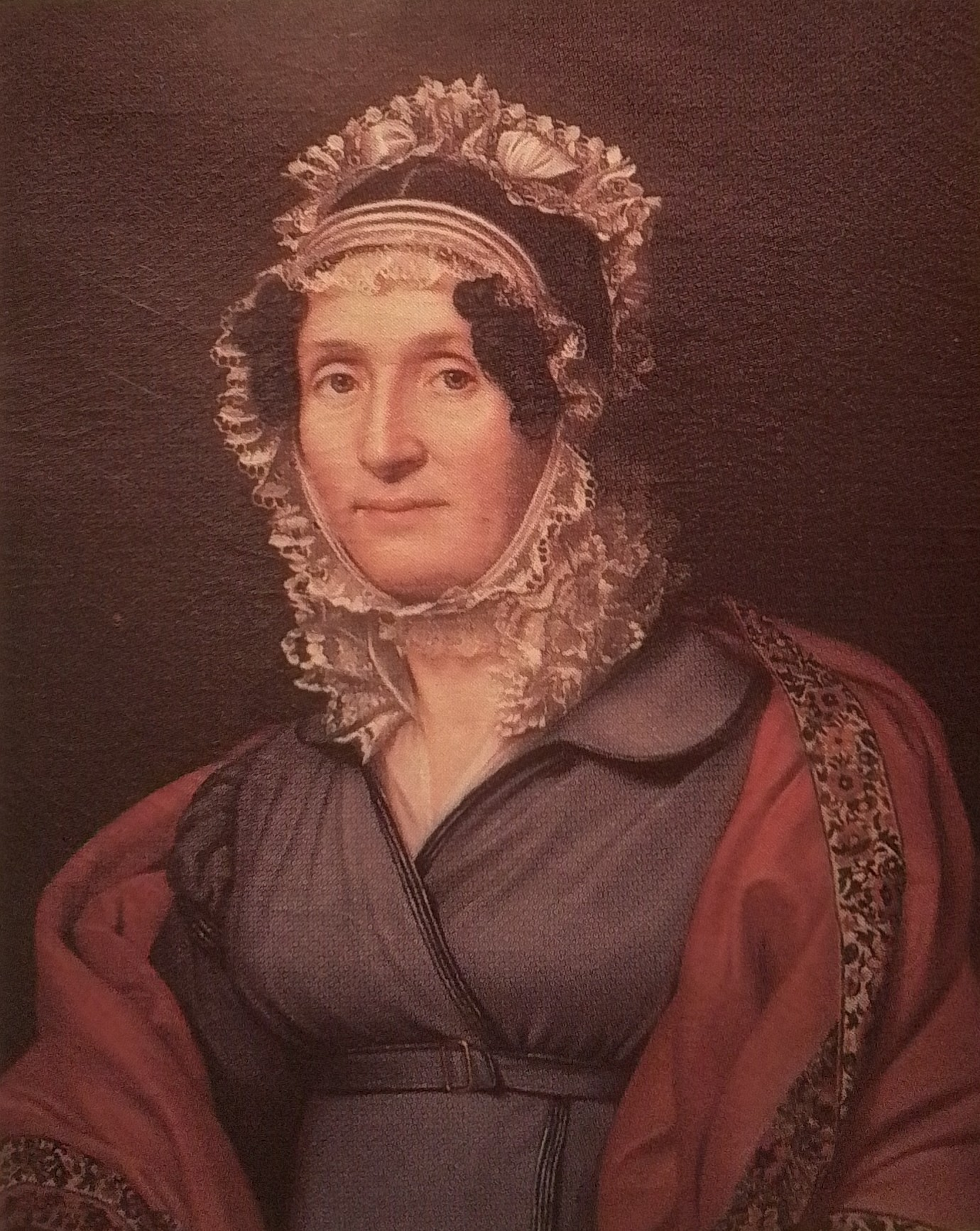
A portrait of Napoleon's mother, Letitia Ramolino Bonaparte, 1811

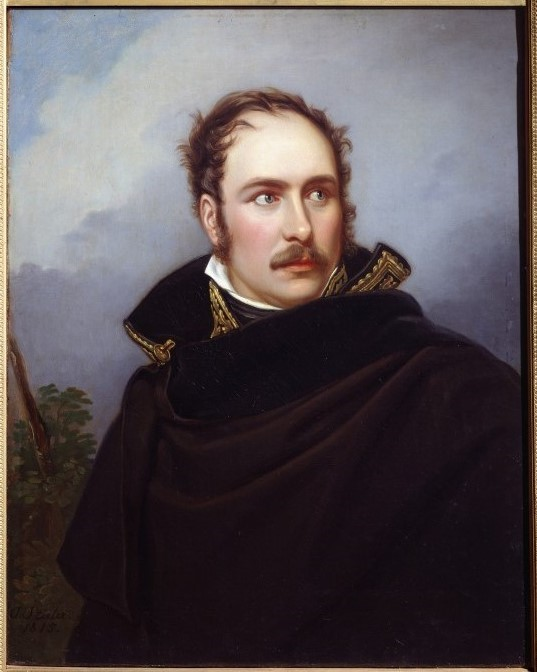
A portrait of Napoleon's stepson Eugène de Beauharnais, 1815.

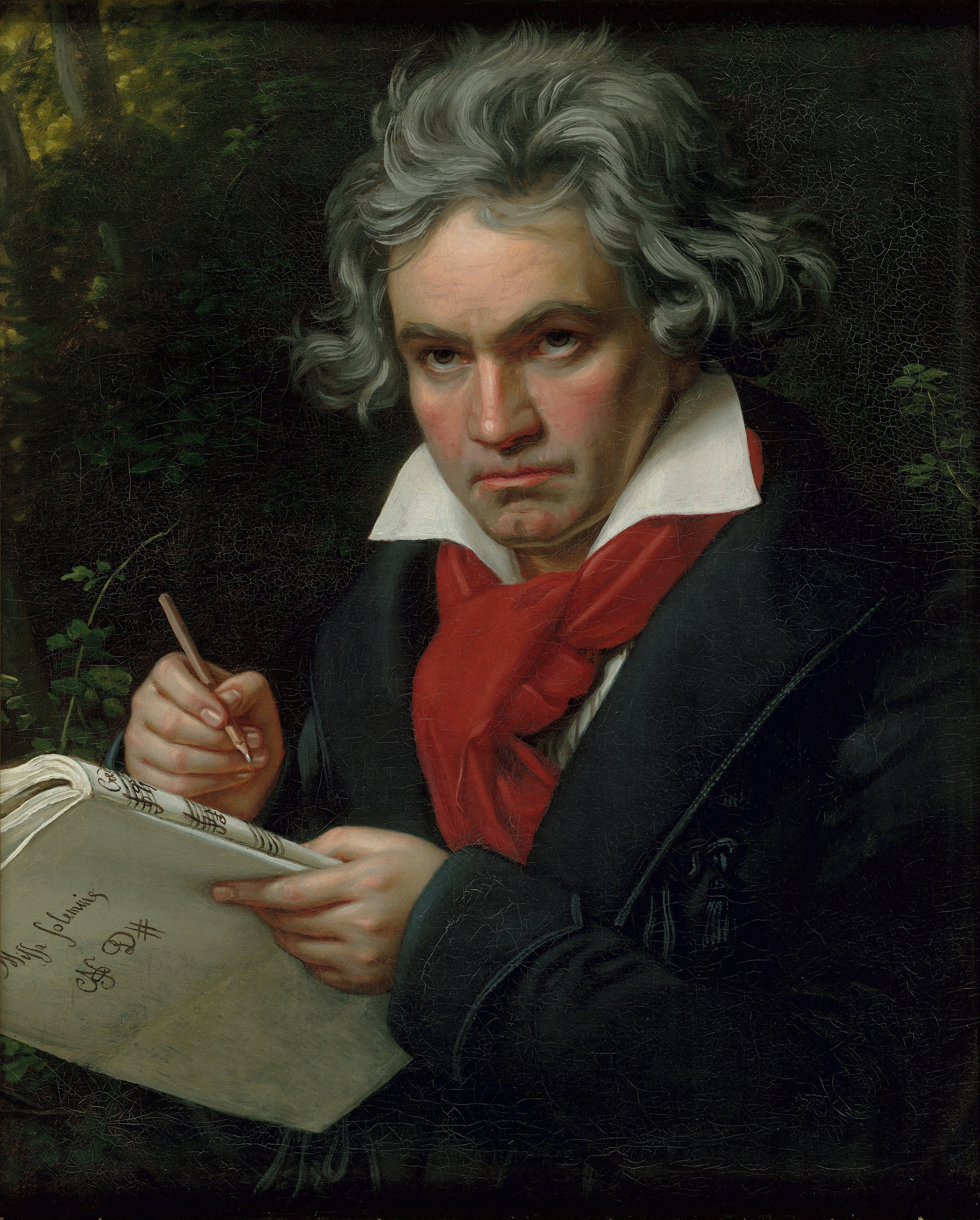
A portrait of Ludwig van Beethoven, 1820. Possibly Stieler's most reproduced work.

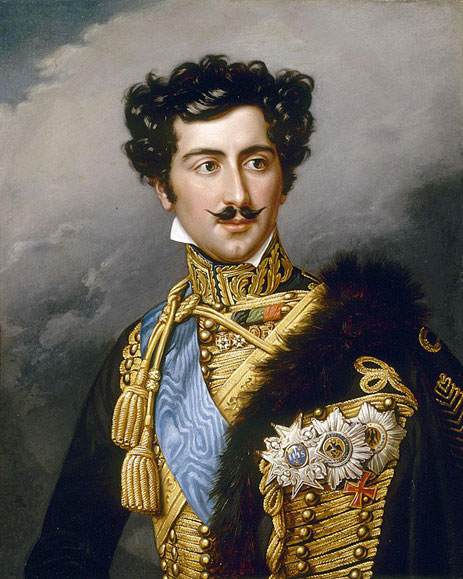
Crown Prince Oscar of Sweden, 1823

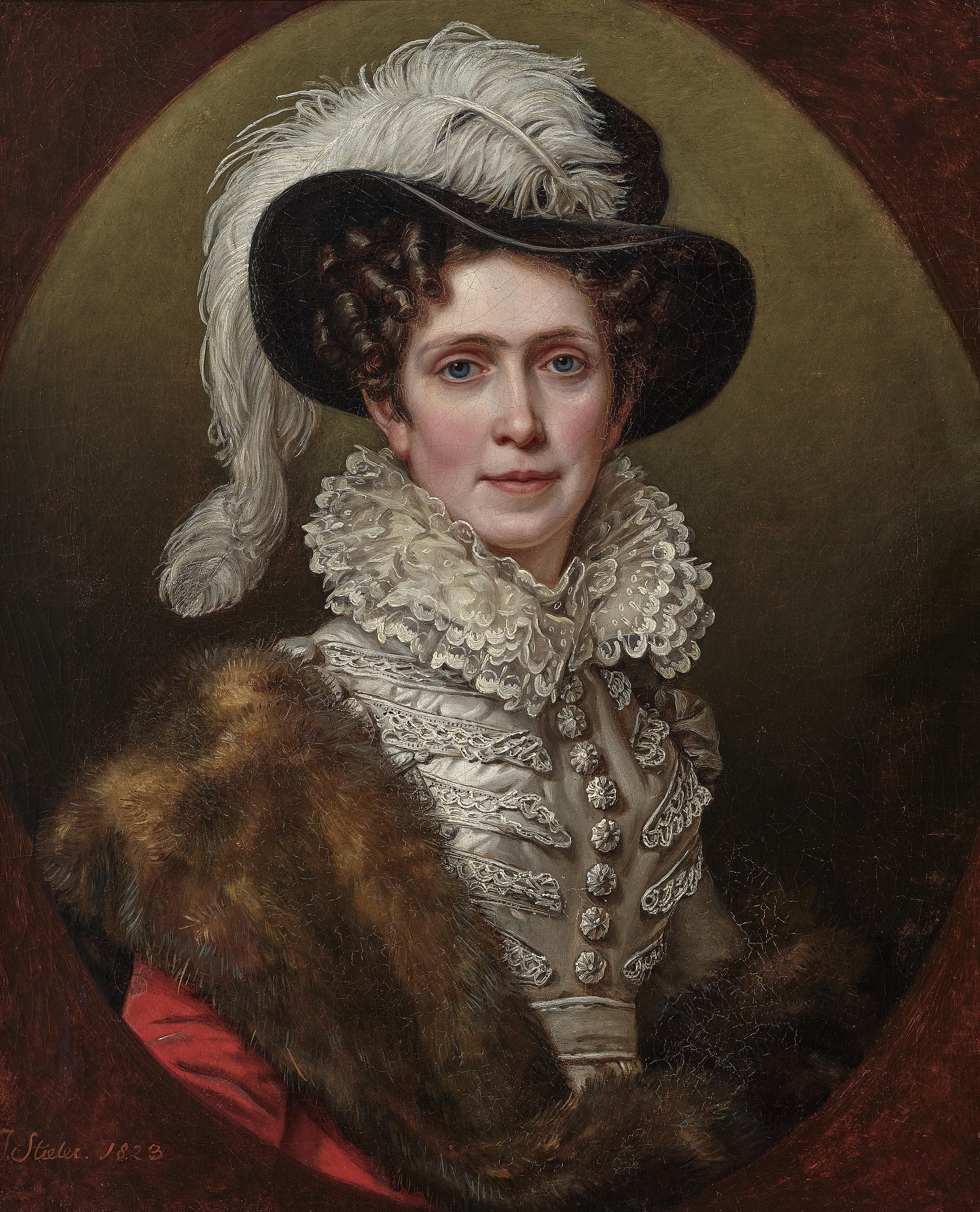
Caroline of Baden, 1823

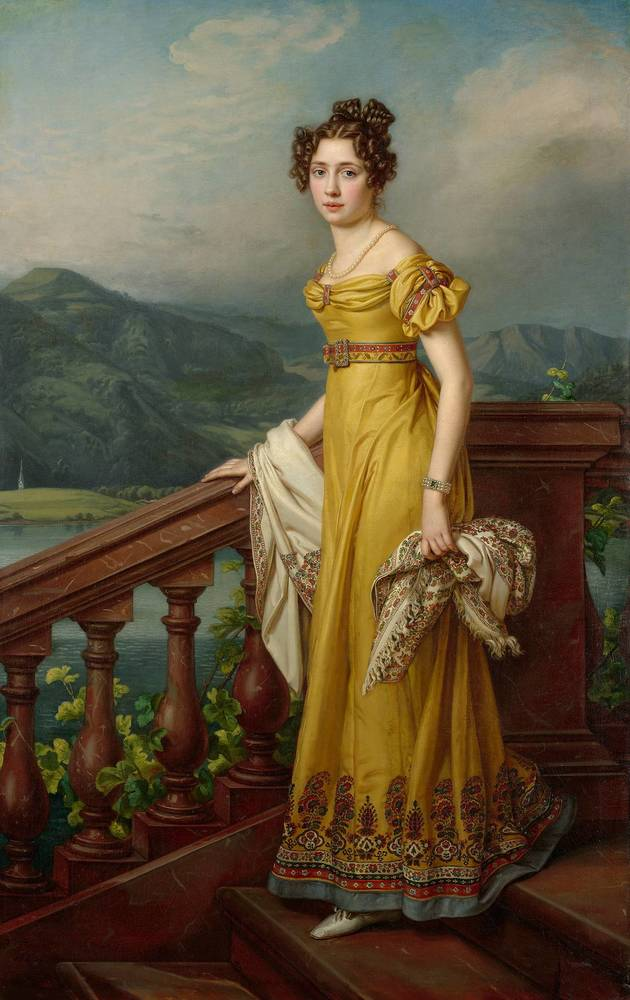
Portrait of Amalie Auguste of Bavaria, 1823

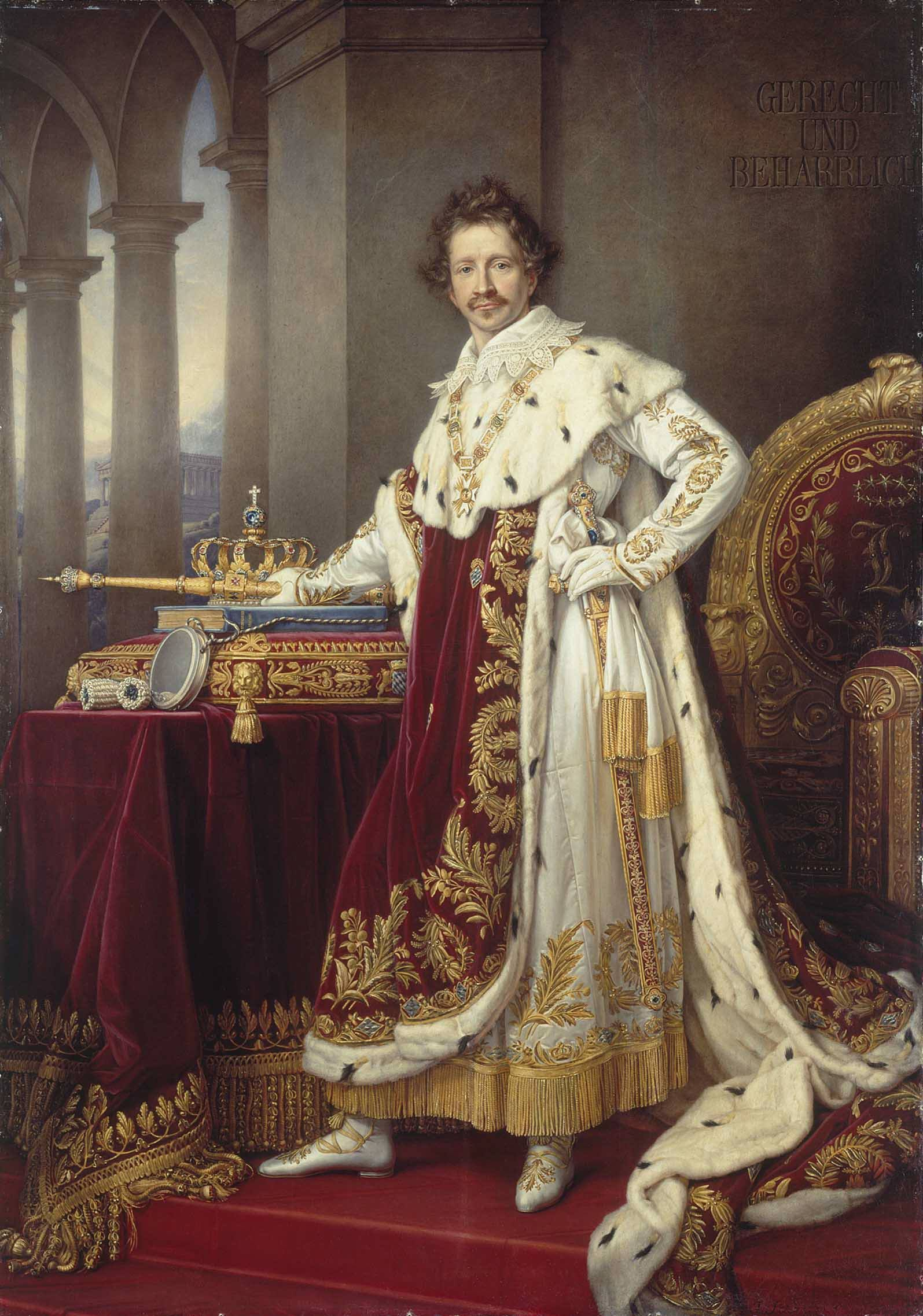
Portrait of Ludwig I in his Coronation Robes, 1826

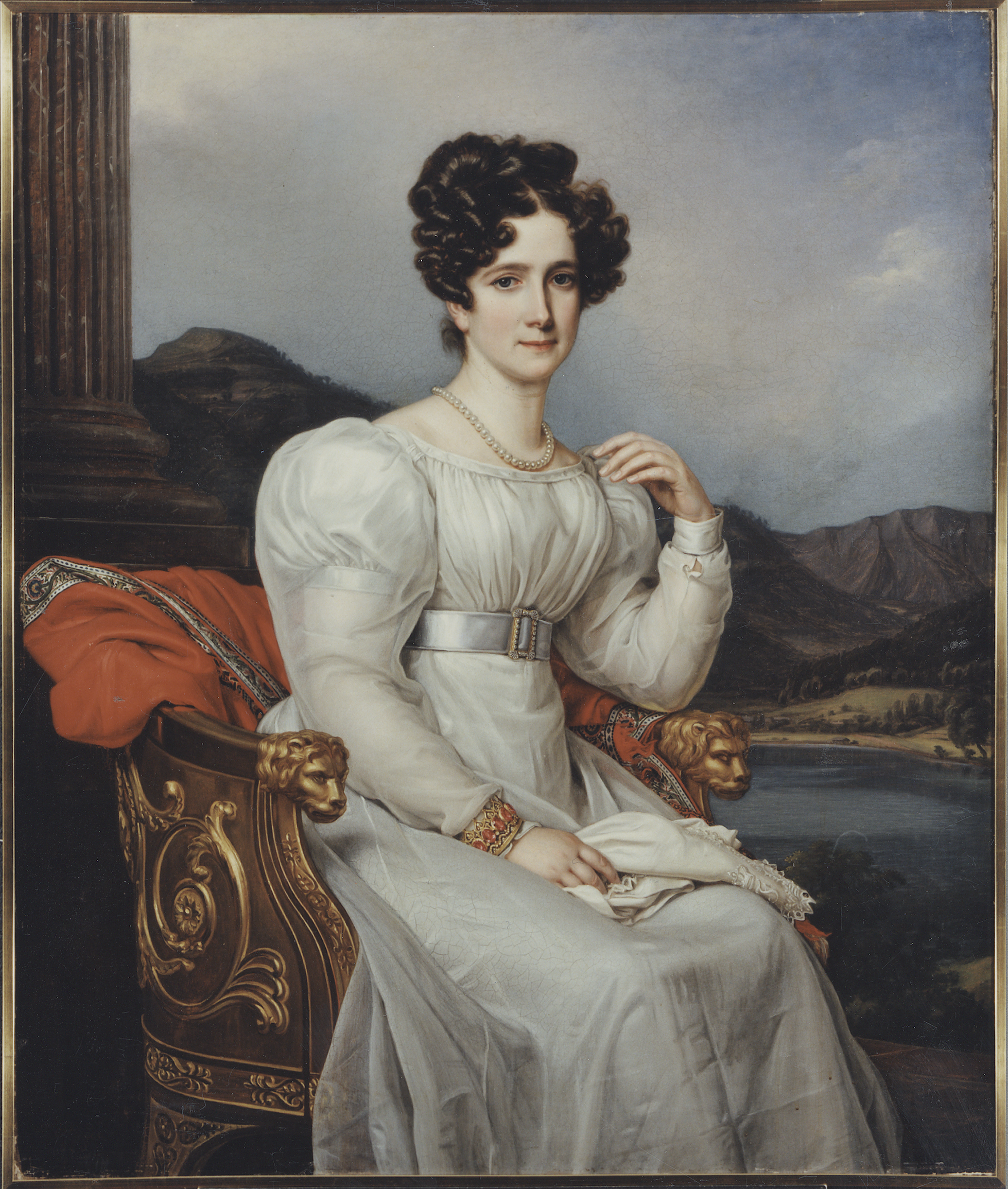
Frederica of Baden, 1826

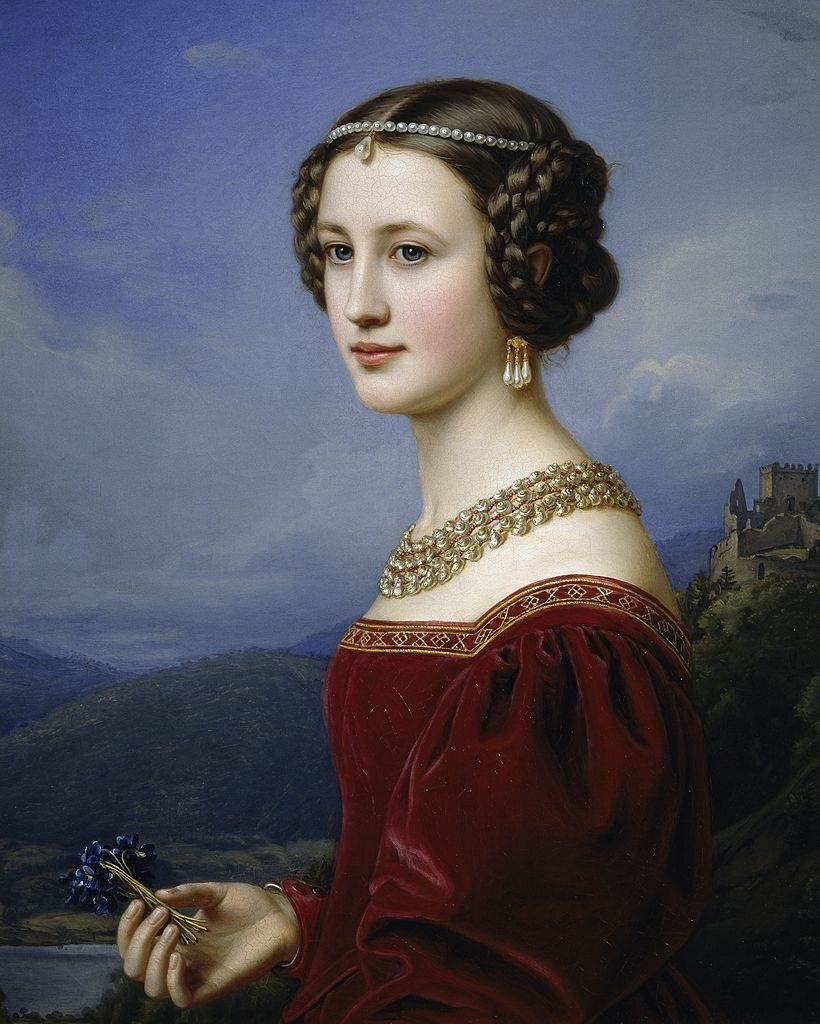
Cornelia Vetterlein, 1828

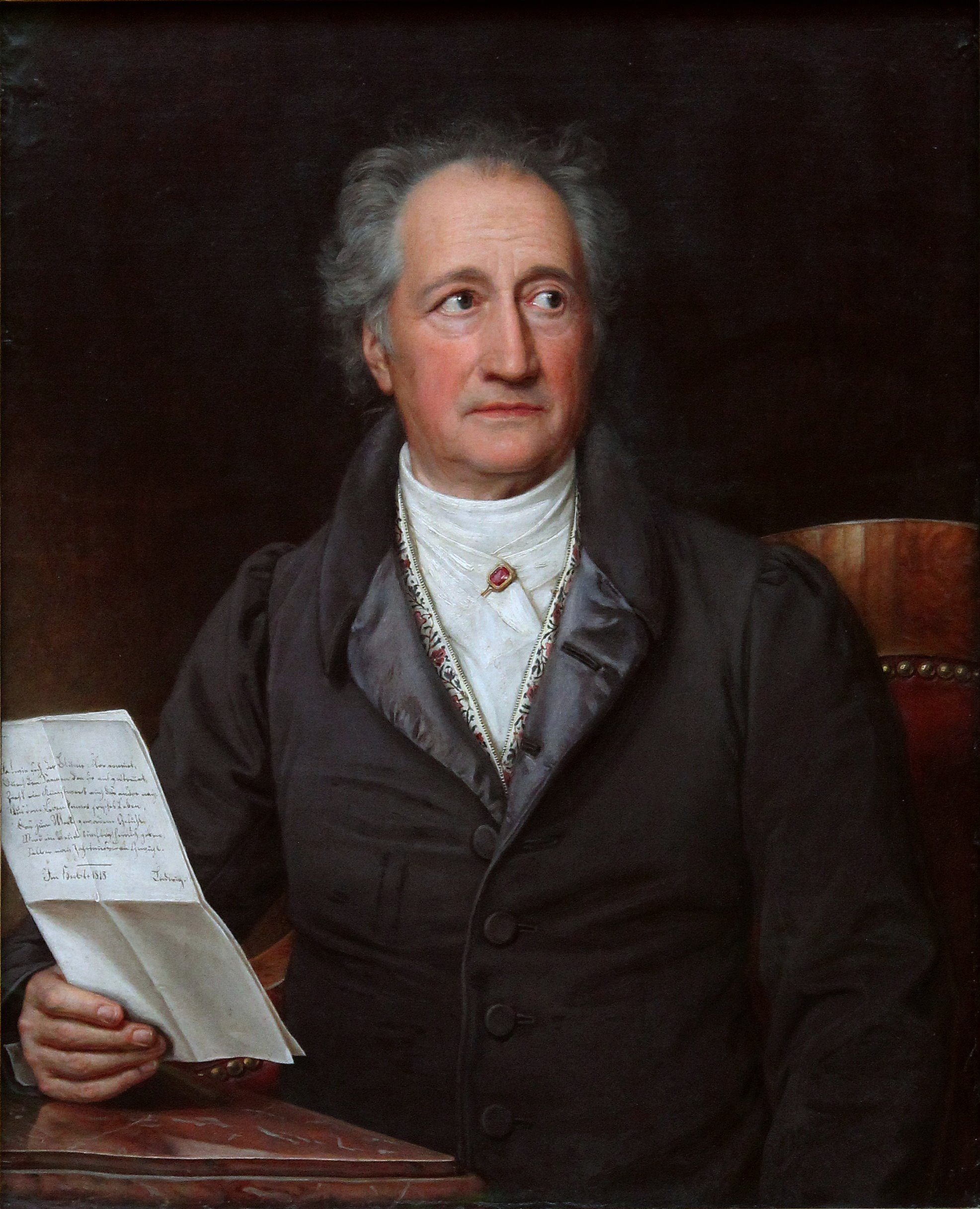
Johann Wolfgang von Goethe, 1828

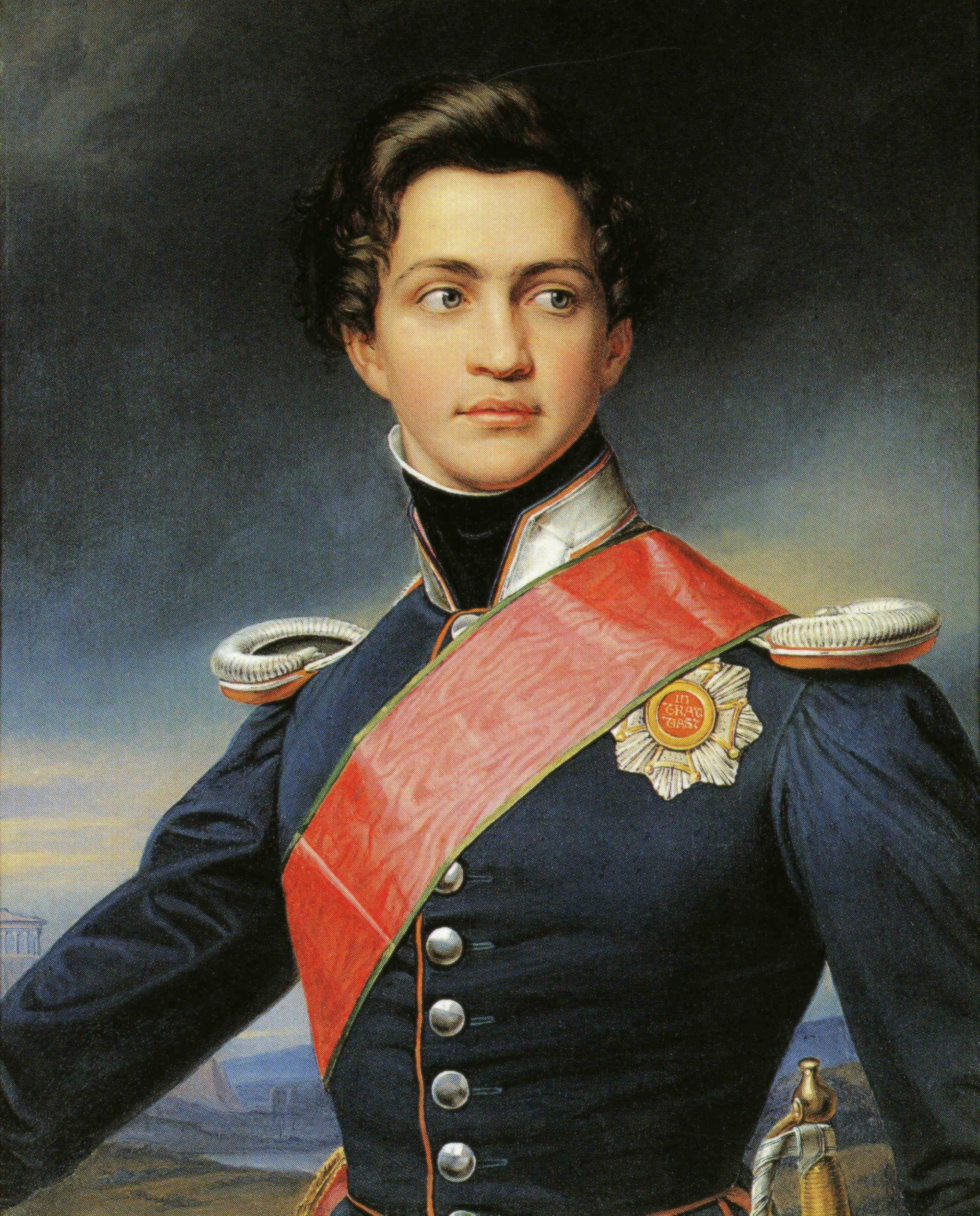
Otto of Greece, 1833

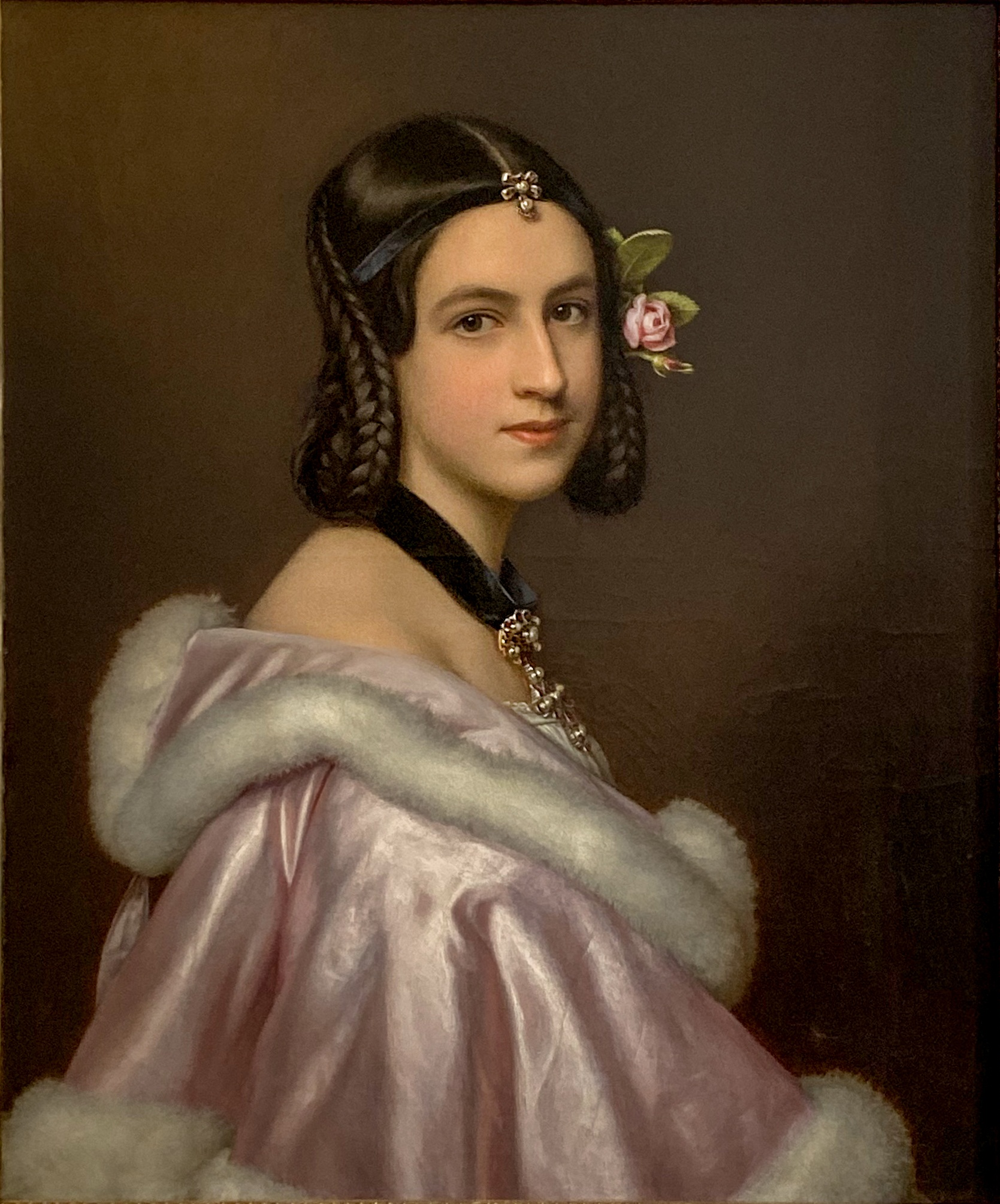
Jane Erskine, 1837

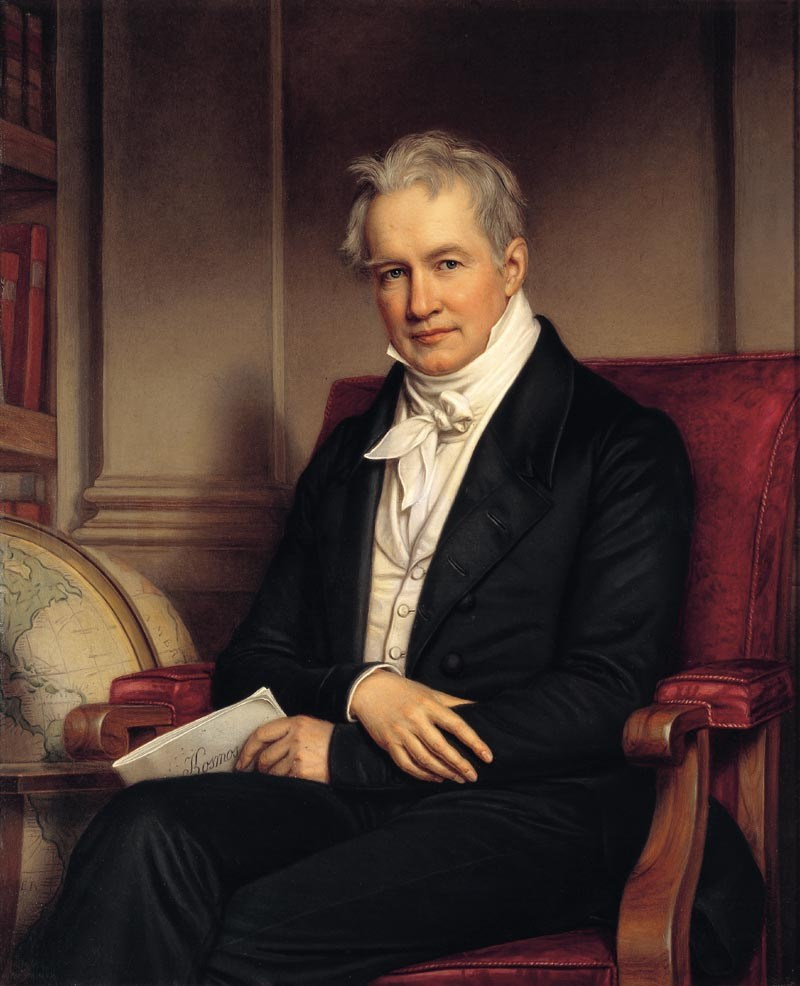
Alexander von Humboldt, 1843

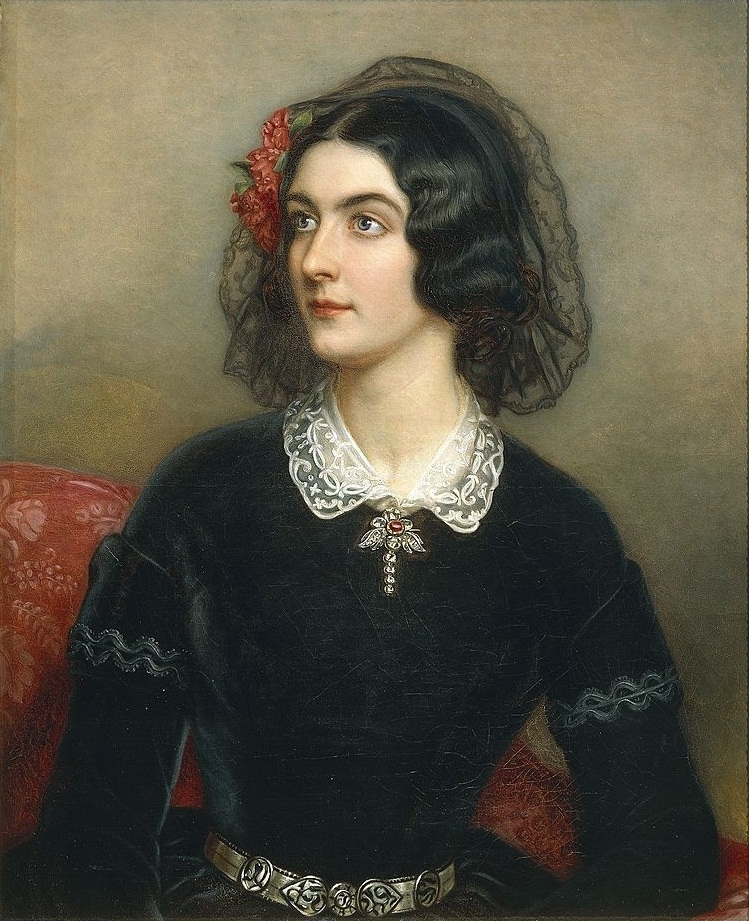
Portrait of Lola Montez, 1847

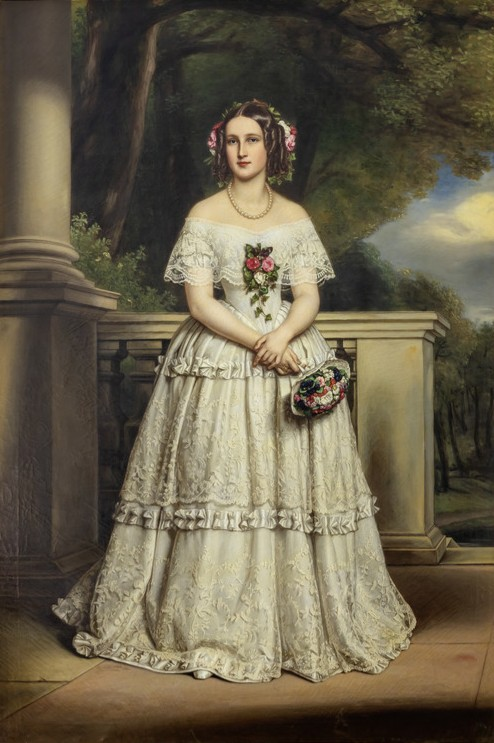
Princess Elisabeth of Schwarzburg-Rudolstadt, 1852
