= Portrait of Ludwig I of Bavaria =

Painting by Joseph Karl Stieler

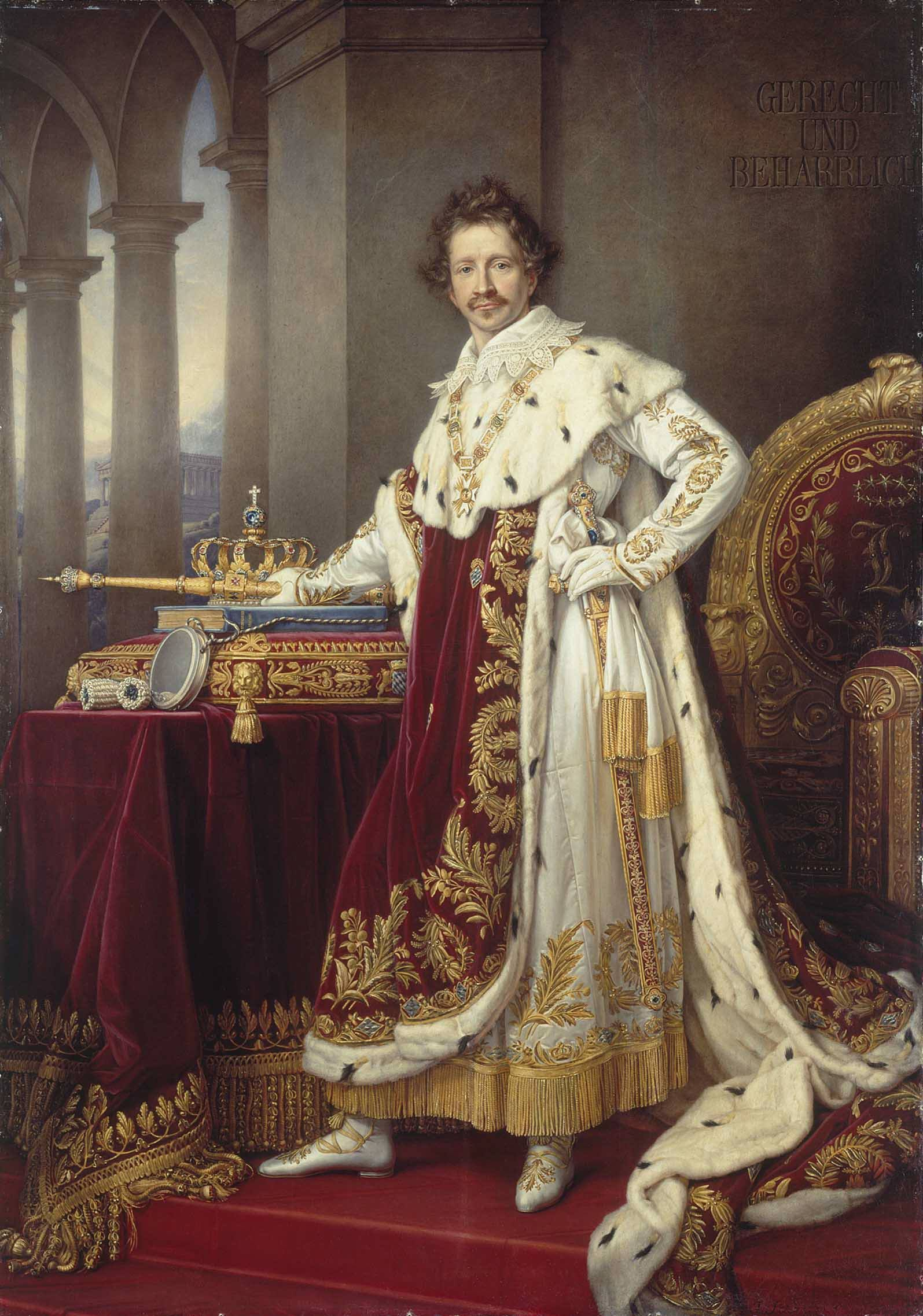
- Artist: Joseph Karl Stieler
- Year: 1826
- Type: Oil on canvas, portrait
- Dimensions: 244 cm × 171 cm (96 in × 67 in)
- Location: Neue Pinakothek, Munich

Portrait of Ludwig I of Bavaria is an oil on canvas portrait painting by the German artist Joseph Karl Stieler, from 1826. It depicts Ludwig I of Bavaria in his coronation robes. The painting is now in the Neue Pinakothek, in Munich.

== History and description ==
Stieler had been court painter in the Bavarian capital Munich since 1820. In 1823 he had painted the Portrait of Amalie Auguste of Bavaria, featuring Ludwig's younger sister. Ludwig subsequently commissioned Stieler to supply many of the paintings for his Gallery of Beauties at the Nymphenburg Palace.

After succeeding his father Maximilian Joseph, Ludwig became the second king of Bavaria, then an independent state and a member of the German Confederation. He was known for his patronage of architecture and the arts. Ludwig is shown dressed in his robes for his coronation. Sitting next to him are a copy of the Bavarian Constitution of 1818 and the Crown of Bavaria.

== Bibliography ==
- Comini, Alessandra. The Changing Image of Beethoven: A Study in Mythmaking. Sunstone Press, 2008.
- Hales, Shelley & Touati, Anne-Marie Leander. Returns to Pompeii: Interior Space and Decoration Documented and Revived, 18th-20th Century. Department of Archaeology and Ancient History, 2016 .
- Von Hase-Schmundt, Ulrike. Joseph Stieler, 1781–1858: Sein Leben u. sein Werk. Krit. Verzeichnis d. Werke. Prestel, 1971.
