= John Clubbe (academic) =

American academic (1938–2022)

- Born: February 21, 1938
- Died: February 24, 2022 (aged 84)
- Awards: Guggenheim Fellowship (1975)

Academic background
- Education: Columbia University (BA, MA, PhD)

Academic work
- Discipline: English Romanticism
- Institutions: Duke University; University of Kentucky

John Louis Edwin Clubbe (February 21, 1938 – February 24, 2022) was an American academic. He was an emeritus professor of English at the University of Kentucky.

== Biography ==
Clubbe received his B.A., M.A., and Ph.D. from Columbia University. He also attended the University of Paris in 1966. He taught at Duke University and the University of Kentucky from 1976 to 1999 and is an expert on English Romanticism, especially the works of Lord Byron. He was a longtime president of the International Association of Byron Societies and the Byron Society of America, where he was chair from 1974 through 1999.

Clubbe received a Guggenheim Fellowship in 1975 as well as a National Endowment for the Humanities Fellowship into Thomas Carlyle.

He died on February 24, 2022, at age 84.

== Bibliography ==
- Victorian Forerunner: The Later Career of Thomas Hood (1968)
- Selected Poems of Thomas Hood (1970), editor
- Two Reminiscences of Thomas Carlyle (1974), editor
- Nineteenth Century Literary Perspectives (1974), editor
- Carlyle and His Contemporaries (1977), editor
- Froude's Life of Carlyle (1979), editor
- Byron et la Suisse (1982)
- English Romanticism: The Grounds of Belief (co-author with Ernest J. Lovell, 1983)
- Victorian Perspectives: Six Essays (co-author with Jerome Meckier, 1989)
- Cincinnati Observed: Architecture and History (1992)
- Beethoven: The Relentless Revolutionary (2019)
