= Louis of Oettingen-Wallerstein =

Bavarian statesman and German prince

Louis Kraft Ernest und Oettingen-Wallerstein
- Prince of Oettingen-Wallerstein
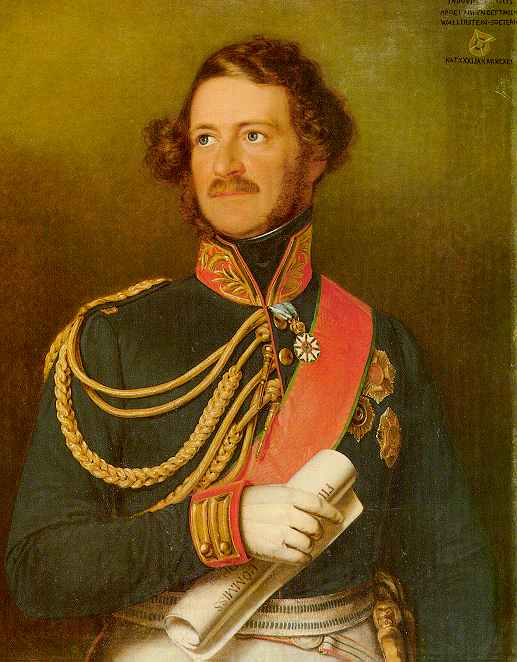
- Native name: Ludwig Kraft Ernst
- Born: 31 January 1791; Wallerstein, Bavaria
- Died: 22 June 1870 (aged 79); Lucerne, Switzerland
- Noble family: House of Oettingen-Wallerstein
- Spouses: Maria Crescentia Bourgin (m. 1823; died 1853) Countess Albertine Larisch von Moennich (m. 1857)
- Mother: Wilhelmine Friederike

Louis Kraft Ernest, Prince of Oettingen-Wallerstein (German Ludwig Kraft Ernst Karl Fürst zu Öttingen-Öttingen und Öttingen-Wallerstein) (31 January 1791 – 22 June 1870) was a Bavarian statesman and German prince of the House of Oettingen-Wallerstein. He succeeded his father as ruling Prince of Wallerstein in 1802 but lost his sovereignty in 1806 due to Mediatisation.

He served as the Bavarian Minister of the Interior from 1832 to 1837 and during the revolutions of 1848, he was caretaker of the Ministry of Foreign Affairs and Culture. Between 1849 and 1858, he was as a member of the Second Chamber of the Bavarian State Parliament on the side of the liberal wing. A well-known art collector, he expanded the Oettingen-Wallerstein collection and library, part of which was acquired by King Ludwig I for his own collection.

== Early life ==
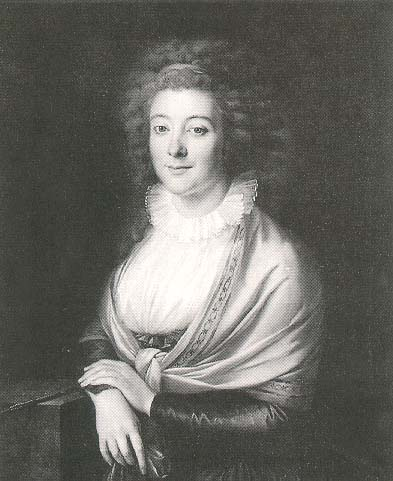
Duchess Wilhelmine Friederike of Württemberg, regent of the Principality of Oettingen-Wallerstein during Louis's minority

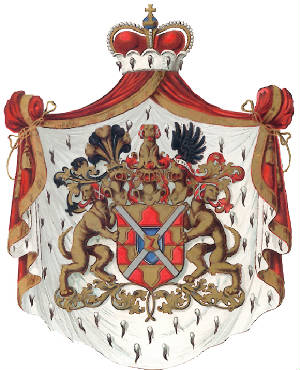
Princely arms of the Oettingen-Wallerstein family

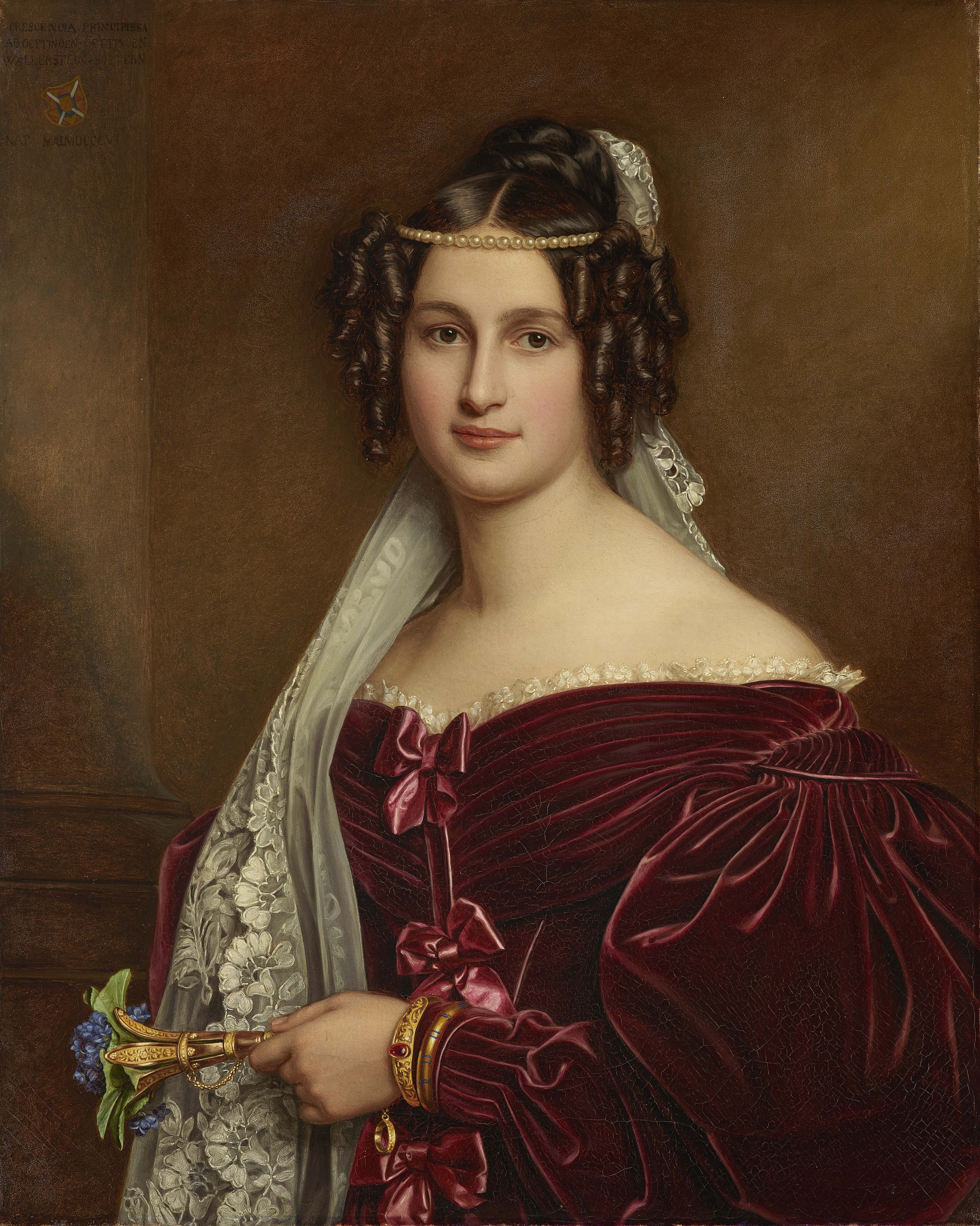
His first wife: Maria Crescentia Bourgin

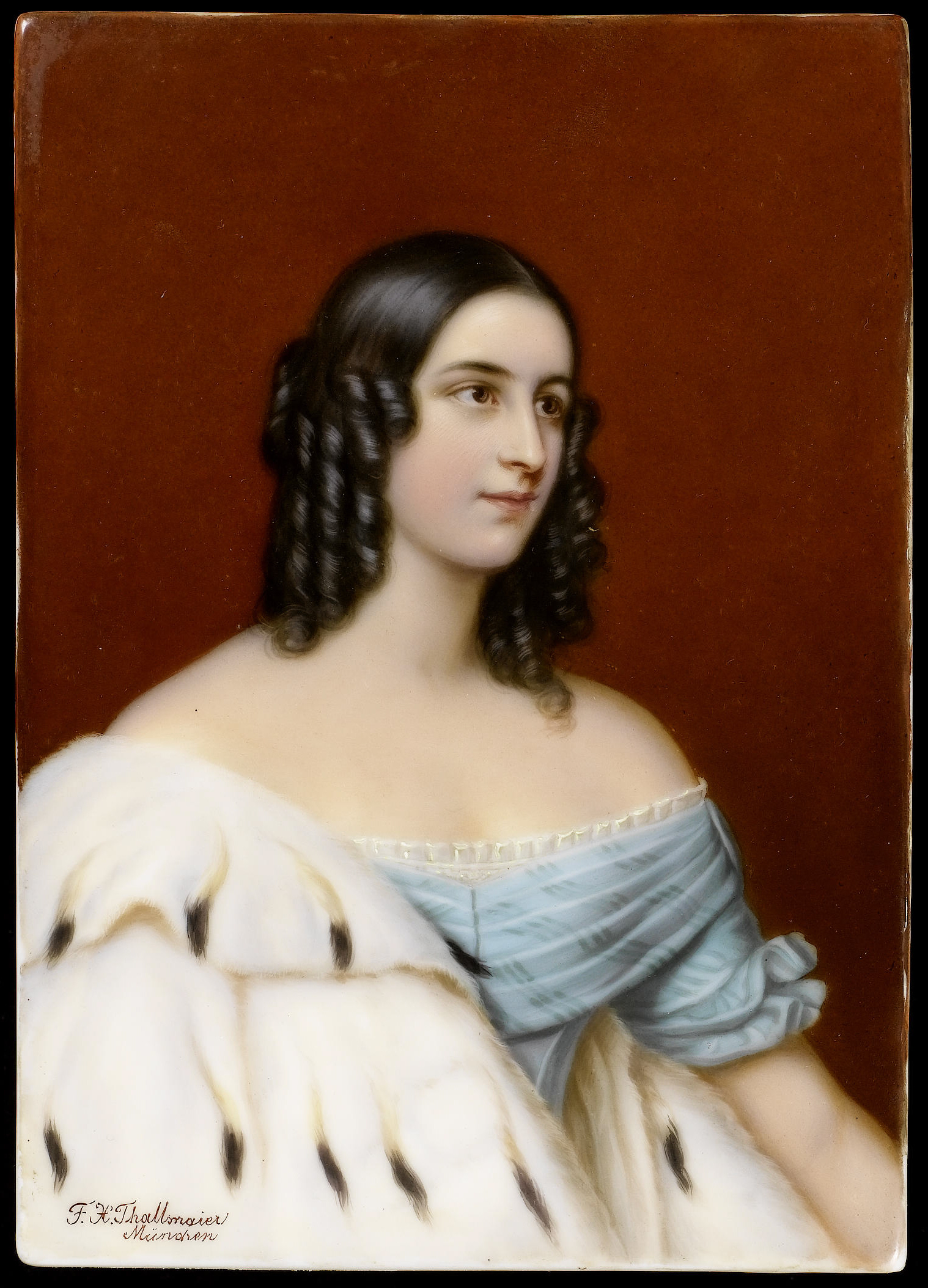
His daughter, Princess Caroline

Louis was born at Wallerstein on 31 January 1791. He was the eldest son of Kraft Ernst, 1st Prince of Oettingen-Wallerstein (1748–1802) and his wife, Duchess Wilhelmine Friederike of Württemberg (1764-1817), daughter of Louis Eugene, Duke of Württemberg.

He received private lessons from the piarist Andreas Reubel and later from a secular canon. After his maternal grandfather's death in 1802, his mother took over the guardianship and ran the official affairs of the principality in Nördlinger Ries. Four years later, he traveled to Paris with his mother to be introduced to Emperor Napoleon and to ask Napoleon for the sovereignty of the principality. It failed, however, because he refused to enter French service. In the capital of France, Oettingen-Wallerstein first met Crown Prince Ludwig I, who became a close friend. In 1807, the principality was mediated, with parts of the principality annexed into both the Kingdom of Bavaria and the Kingdom of Württemberg.

Between 1807 and 1810, he studied law at the University of Landshut where he befriended Eduard von Schenk, later the Bavarian Minister of the Interior. Oettingen-Wallerstein's views on the state were influenced by the legal scholars Nikolaus Thaddäus von Gönner and Friedrich Carl von Savigny.

== Career ==
=== Wars of Liberation ===
When he reached maturity, he took over the lifetime post of Crown Court Master of Bavaria in 1810 and received a seat in the Council of State. Oettingen-Wallerstein organized general armaments in the Oberdonaukreis during the German Campaign of 1813. Until 1831 he kept the post as district commander of the Landwehr. In 1811 and 1814, he visited Paris again, with the 1814 visit said to have been in diplomatic service for Bavaria.

=== Political career ===
Oettingen-Wallerstein's political career began in 1815 as a member of the Württemberg Assembly of Estates. As the first estate commissioner at the Württemberg meeting of the estates, he contributed a great deal to the completion of the constitution, and stood up as an advocate for the old estates institutions and as a representative of the constitutional principle, he also influenced the draft of the constitution of the Kingdom of Bavaria from 1818.

As a prince of a Mediatized House, he was also a hereditary Imperial Councilor of the Kingdoms of Bavaria and took part in the Bavarian State Assemblies in 1819 and 1822 in the Chamber of Imperial Councillors (First Chamber). In 1819, he represented aristocratic interests against liberal tendencies. In 1822, he opposed the restriction of the military budget by the Chamber of Deputies (Second Chamber). With his commitment to the nobility, Oettingen-Wallerstein stood in contradiction to the progressive Crown Prince Ludwig I. The commitment to a well-stocked royal civil list and criticism of the alleged rule of officials met with approval.

In 1823, he fell in love with Maria Crescentia Bourgin. The marriage was to be seen against the background of financial problems of the Princely House, of which Oettingen-Wallerstein was never master. In order to marry, he had to renounce his position as head of the family; which was taken by his younger brother Friedrich. King Maximilian I then withdrew the Bavarian Crown Office and the seat in the First Chamber from Oettingen-Wallerstein. Only two years later, Maximilian I died and Crown Prince Ludwig I ascended the throne, Oettingen-Wallerstein received all of his offices back. The new king appointed him general commissioner and regional president of the Oberdonaukreis on 14 April 1828. Oettingen-Wallerstein showed his gratitude to Ludwig I for returning the seat in the First Chamber in 1828 by opposing his peers and vehemently defending his regent's reform plans.

He served as minister of the interior in the Kingdom of Bavaria between 1832 and 1837 and as foreign minister in 1848/49. From 1819 until 1849 he was a member of the First Chamber and from 1849 until 1858 of the Second Chamber of the Bavarian Parliament.

== Personal life ==
In 1823 he married Maria Crescentia Bourgin (1806–1853) in a morganatic marriage, thus being stripped of his headship of the House.

Together, they were the parents of:

- Princess Caroline Antoinette Wilhelmine Friederike und Oettingen-Wallerstein (1824–1883), who married Count Hugo Philipp Waldbott-Bassenheim zu Buxheim and Heggbach (1820-1895) and had issue
- Princess Theresia Wilhelmine Frederike Creszentia und Oettingen-Wallerstein (1827–1833), who died young.

After her death he married Countess Albertine Larisch von Moennich (1819–1900), daughter of Count Heinrich Larisch von Moennich (1793-1859) and his wife, Countess Henriette von Haugwitz (1799-1884).

A passionate art collector, he spent almost all of his money on artworks and in 1862 had to move to Switzerland to escape being arrested on the request of his creditors.

== Death ==
Prince Louis died at Lucerne on 22 June 1870, aged 79. His body was buried alongside his first wife, in the Monastery of Maria Immaculata, Maihingen.

=== Descendants ===
Through his eldest daughter Caroline, he was a grandfather of:

- Count Friedrich Ludwig Waldbott von Bassenheim (1844–1910), who married Rosa Schürch (1855-1904);
- Countess Maria Waldbott von Bassenheim (1861–1913), who married her mother's cousin, Moritz, Prince Oettingen-Oettingen and Oettingen-Wallerstein (1838-1910) (the son of Prince Louis' younger brother Karl Anselm Kraf, Prince Oettingen-Oettingen and Oettingen-Wallerstein).

== Orders and decorations ==
- Baden: Grand Cross of the House Order of Fidelity, 1812
- Kingdom of Bavaria:
  - Knight of St. Hubert, 1820
  - Grand Cross of Merit of the Bavarian Crown, 1820
- Kingdom of Prussia: Knight of the Johanniter Order
- Württemberg: Knight of the Golden Eagle
