= Lex familiae =

In the Holy Roman Empire, the lex familiae or ius curiae (German Hofrecht) during the Middle Ages (11th to 15th centuries) was the legislation concerning the relation between the free owner of an estate with both his free workers and his unfree serfs, as well as the legal relations among those employed at an estate. The Hofrecht concerns the "private" affairs within an estate, as opposed to the Landrecht.

The nature of these laws was subject to evolution over the centuries. Their original scope is exemplified by the lex familiae of Burchard of Worms (early 11th century), which was likely based directly on older, early medieval, laws. In the course of the High Middle Ages, the status of the ministeriales was detached from the scope of the lex familiae, and it was further weakened by the development of communal statutes, especially in the context of the development of free cities.
