= Maurus Gandershofer =

German librarian and historian

Georg Maurus Gandershofer (22 January 1780 in Pentling – 28 August 1843 in Regensburg) was a German librarian and historian.

He trained in theology at the abbey in Metten, and from 1803 to 1809 was a teacher and school inspector in Straubing. In 1809/10 he studied philosophy in Landshut, where from 1810 to 1814 he served as curator at the university library. From 1814 onward, he worked in the royal court library at Munich, and in 1828, by way of a recommendation from Lorenz von Westenrieder, he became an employee of the Bavarian Academy of Sciences. In 1832 he relocated as a librarian and archivist to Regensburg. He also served as librarian of the Historischen Vereins für den Regenkreis (Historical Association for the Regenkreis).

== Selected works ==
- Denkwürdigkeiten der Domkirche zu Freysing, 1824, Memoirs of the cathedral at Freising.
- Lexikon baierischer Gelehrten und Schriftsteller bis zum Ende des siebenzehnten Jahrhunderts, (with Anton Maria Kobolt, 1825), Lexicon of Bavarian scholars and writers until the end of the seventeenth century.
- Kurze chronologische Geschichte der Stadt Moosburg in Bayern, 1827, short chronological history of the town of Moosburg in Bavaria.
- Erinnerungen an Lorenz von Westenrieder, 1830, Memories of Lorenz von Westenrieder.
- Chronik des Marktes und Badeortes Abach nächst Regensburg, 1835 – Chronicle of the market and resort town of Abach, near Regensburg.
