= Mainkreis (Bavaria) =

Former administrative district of the Kingdom of Bavaria

Mainkreis (until 1817) Obermainkreis (from 1817)
- Regierungsbezirk of the Kingdom of Bavaria
- 1808–1837
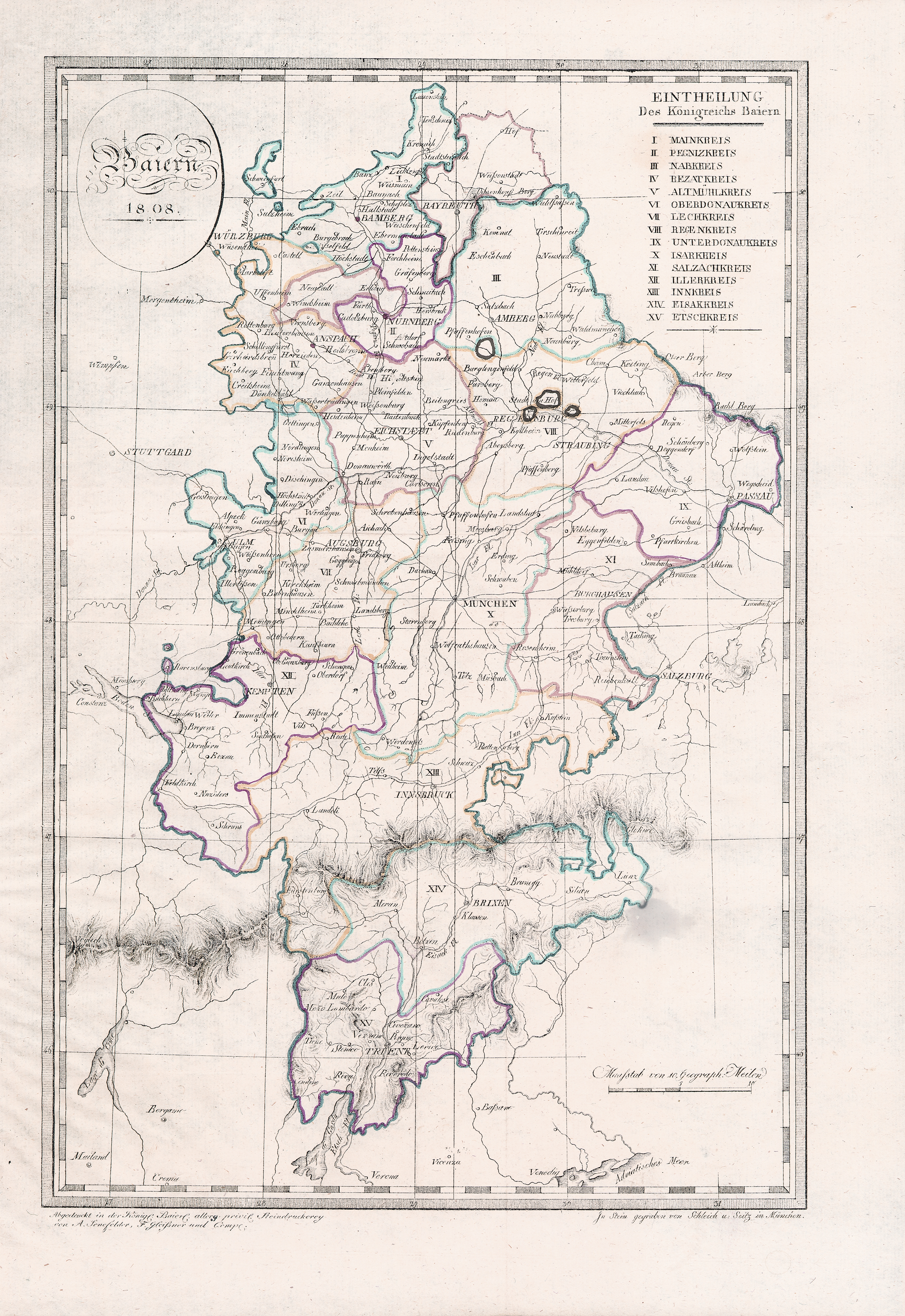
- Districts of Bavaria, including Tyrol, in 1808
- Capital: Bamberg (1808–1812); Bayreuth (1812–1837)
- Government
- Generalkommissär
  - 1810–1814: Friedrich Karl von Thürheim
  - 1815–1832: Constantin Ludwig Freiherr von Welden
  - 1832–1837: Ferdinand Freiherr von Andrian-Werburg
- History
  - Established: 1808
  - Disestablished: 1837
Succeeded by
Upper Franconia; Upper Palatinate
- Today part of: Bavaria

The Mainkreis (German: [River] Main Circle) was one of the 15 administrative districts (German: Regierungsbezirke) of the Kingdom of Bavaria between 1808 and 1837. The district was named after its main river Main and renamed Obermainkreis (Upper Main Circle) in 1817. It was the predecessor of the Regierungsbezirk Oberfranken (Administrative Regional District of Upper Franconia).

== Independent cities ==
- Bamberg
- Bayreuth (since 1812)
- Hof an der Saale (since 1812)
- Schweinfurt (since 1810)

== Subdivisions ==
The district was divided in the following judicial districts (Landgerichte = LG), according to the original borders of the districts of the former territories (Herrschaftsgerichte = HG):

- Bamberg I
- Bamberg II
- Banz LG (since 1813 HG)
- Burgebrach
- Ebermannstadt
- Ebnath HG (since 1816)
- Ebrach
- Eschenbach (since 1810)
- Gefrees (since 1812)
- Gleusdorf
- Hallstadt
- Heinersreuth HG (since 1816)
- Höchstadt (since 1810)
- Hof an der Saale (until 1812)
- Hollfeld
- Kemnath (since 1810)
- Kirchenlamitz (since 1812)
- Kronach
- Kulmbach (since 1812)
- Lauenstein
- Lichtenfels
- Mitwitz HG (since 1813)
- Münchberg (since 1812)
- Naila (since 1812)
- Neustadt an der Waldnaab (since 1810)
- Pegnitz (since 1812)
- Pottenstein (since 1810)
- Rehau (since 1812)
- Scheßlitz
- Schweinfurt (until 1810)
- Selb (since 1812)
- Seßlach (since 1812)
- Stadtsteinach
- Tambach HG (since 1814)
- Teuschnitz
- Tirschenreuth (since 1810)
- Waldsassen (since 1810)
- Weidenberg (since 1812)
- Weismain
- Wunsiedel (since 1812)

== History ==
In 1808 the Kingdom of Bavaria was divided in 15 (state) districts, whose names were taken from their rivers. The Mainkreis, with Bamberg as its capital, was initially composed of 18 rural divisions and, since 1809, of the independent cities of Bamberg and Schweinfurt. In 1810 it grew significantly with the annexation of the Naabkreis. It was again enlarged when it received 12 rural divisions from the former Principality of Bayreuth, whereupon the district administration was moved to Bayreuth. In 1817, the Mainkreis was renamed Obermainkreis (District of the Upper Main River) and slightly expanded. At the same time, a new district with the name of Untermainkreis (District of the Lower Main) was created downriver. The Territorial Reorganization (Gebietsreform) of 29 November 1837, implemented at the request of King Ludwig I, split the judicial districts of the former Naabkreis from the Obermainkreis, assigning them to Oberpfalz (Upper Palatinate) instead, and renamed the shrunken Obermainkreis “Oberfranken” (Upper Franconia).

== Literature ==
- (de) Handbuch der bayerischen Ämter, Gemeinden und Gerichte 1799–1980 (Guide of the Bavarian Districts, Municipalities and Courts 1799–1980), written by Richard Bauer, Reinhard Heydenreuter, Gerhard Heyl, Emma Mages, Max Piendl, August Scherl, Bernhard Zittel and edited by Wilhelm Volkert, Senior Professor at the University of Regensburg, Munich, 1983, ISBN 3-406-09669-7
