= Caroline von Oettingen-Wallerstein =

19th-century German noblewoman

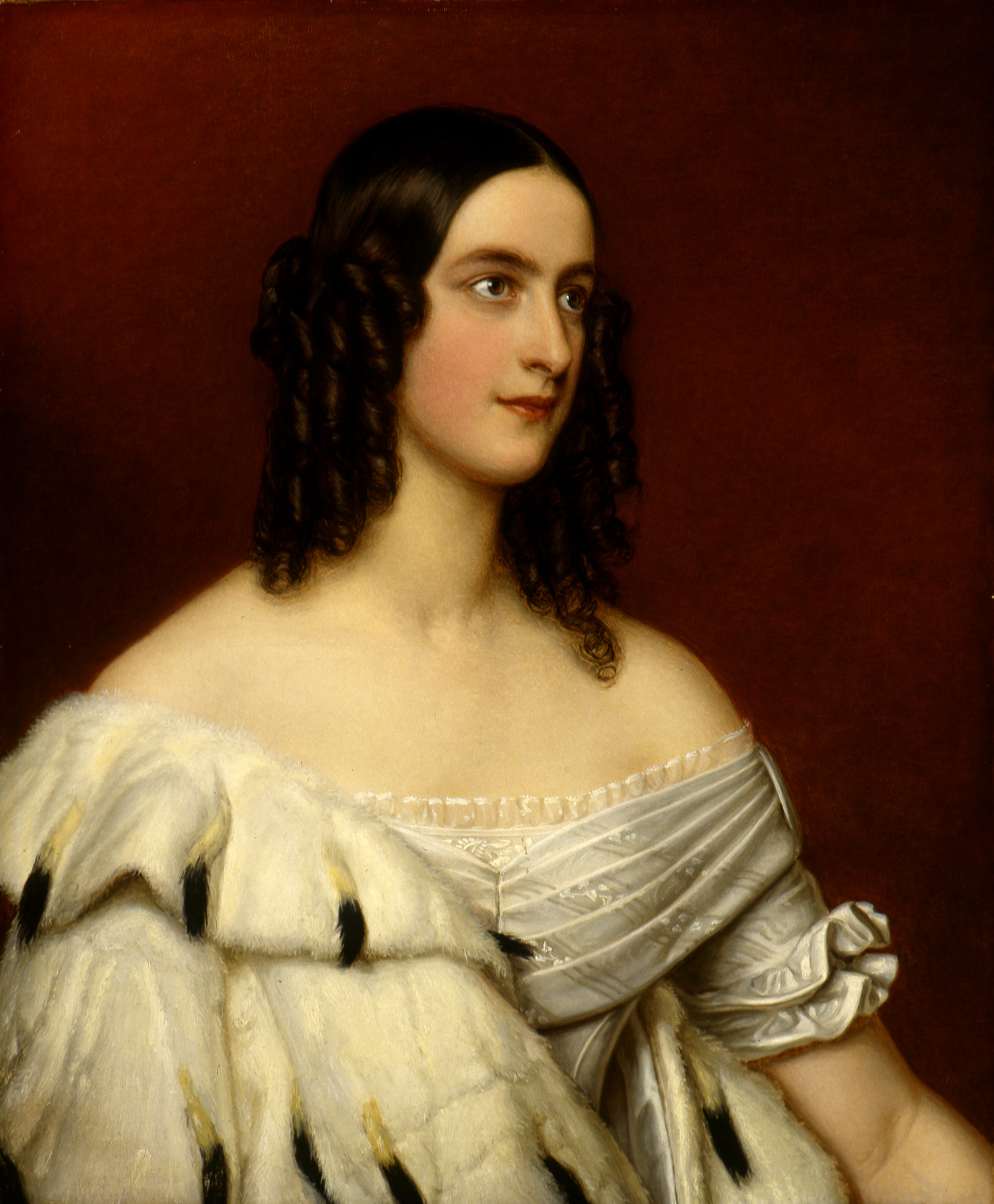
Princess Caroline of Öttingen-Öttingen and Öttingen-Wallerstein in a painting for the Gallery of Beauties, painted by Joseph Karl Stieler in 1843

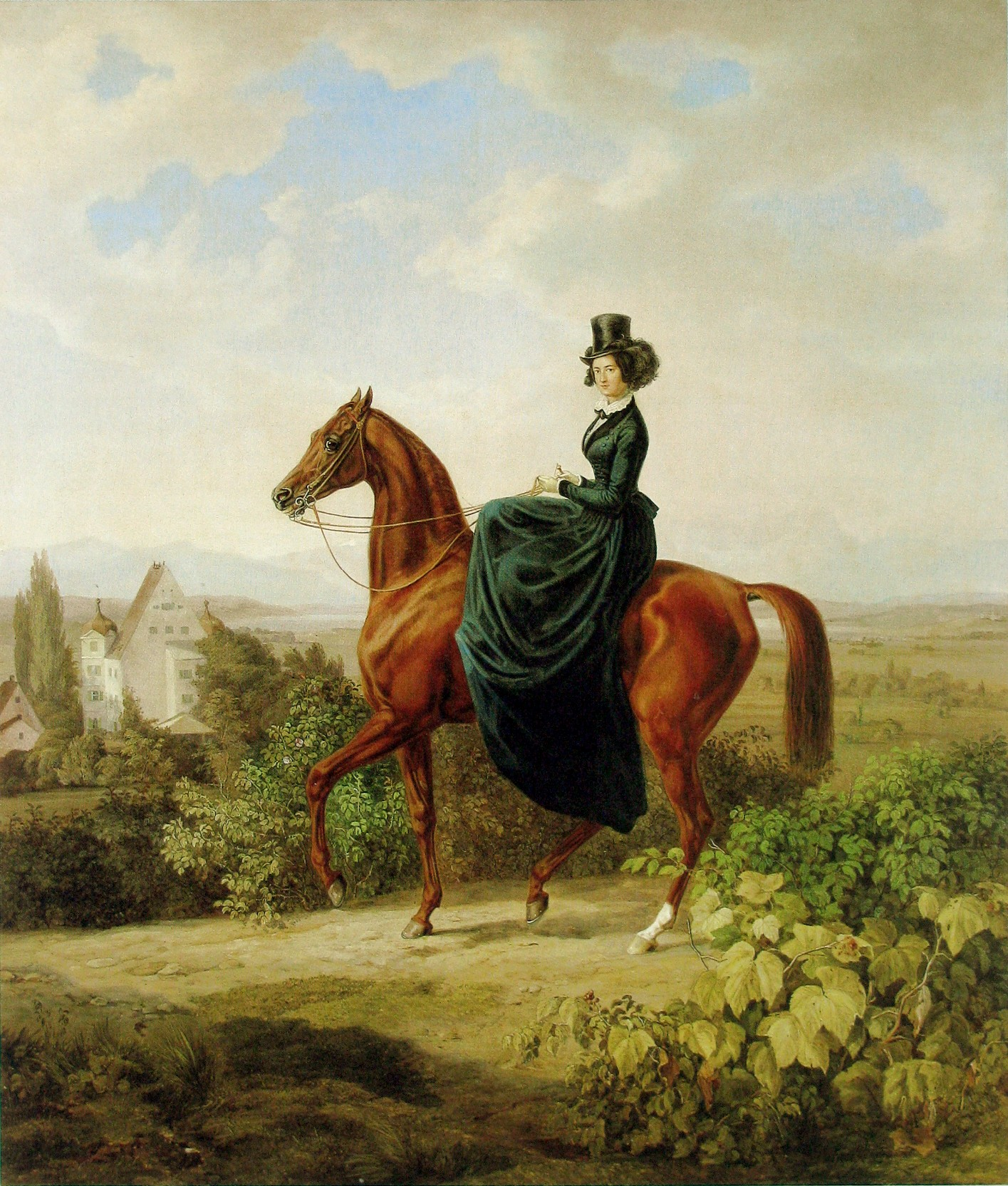
Countess Caroline von Waldbott-Bassenheim, née Oettingen-Oettingen and Oettingen-Wallerstein on horseback on a hill near Leutstetten; Leutstetten Castle in the background, painted by Albrecht Adam, 1850/1855

Princess Caroline Antoinette Wilhelmine Friederike of Oëttingen-Wallerstein, later on Countess Caroline von Waldbott-Bassenheim (19 August 1824 – 14 January 1883), was a German noblewoman who was a daughter of Prince Louis of Oettingen-Wallerstein and Princess Crescentia. Like her mother, she also appeared in the Gallery of Beauties gathered by King Ludwig I of Bavaria in 1843.

== Life ==
Caroline Antoinette Wilhelmine Friederike was born in 1824 at Heiligkreuz Castle near Donauworth and was baptized in the Heilig Kreuz monastery church. The godparents were King Maximilian I Joseph of Bavaria and Queen Caroline. Crown Prince Ludwig of Bavaria (later King Ludwig I of Bavaria) celebrated the king's sponsorship: “I have never been so happy in my life!”

The King and Queen were represented by Count Joseph Sebastian Eligius Fugger von Oberndorf (1749–1826) and his daughter, Countess Maria Antonia Aloysia Fugger von Oberndorf (1799–1885).

Caroline was the daughter of Prince Louis of Oettingen-Wallerstein, who served as a minister under king Ludwig I on several occasions, and Crescentia née Bourgin, whom the king had portraited for the Gallery of Beauties in 1833.

Caroline married in 1843 to Count Hugo Philipp von Waldbott-Bassenheim zu Buxheim and Heggbach (1820–1895). The wedding took place in the court chapel of Archbishop Carl Anselm of Munich-Freising, who also performed the wedding. After their wedding, the young couple—the bride was 19, the groom 23—were long considered the most beautiful couple in Munich.

Count Hugo Philipp von Waldbott-Bassenheim was one of the richest nobles in the Kingdom of Bavaria. An anecdote tells that in a large fashion warehouse, after a long, fruitless examination of the fabrics, the princess broke out with the painful words: "God, how difficult it is to choose when you are so beautiful!"

Together, they had a son and a daughter:

- Friedrich Ludwig Heinrich Hugo, Count Waldbott von Bassenheim (1844–1910); married Rosa Schürch (1855–1904) and had issue
- Maria, Countess Waldbott von Bassenheim (1861–1913), married her cousin, Moritz, Prince of Oettingen-Oettingen und Oettingen-Wallerstein (1838–1910) and had issue

== Death ==
Caroline died on 14 January 1889 in Munich, Bavaria, aged 58. Her body was buried in Buxheim Charterhouse and lies alongside her husband.

== Portrait ==
The portrait of Countess Caroline was painted for the Beauties Gallery in 1843, ten years after that of her mother. The young woman wears a low-cut white ball gown with an ermine fur over it. The shiny black hair is parted smoothly and falls in long curls down to the shoulders, a hairstyle that came from England and was widely worn in Germany in the early 1840s.
