= Rezatkreis =

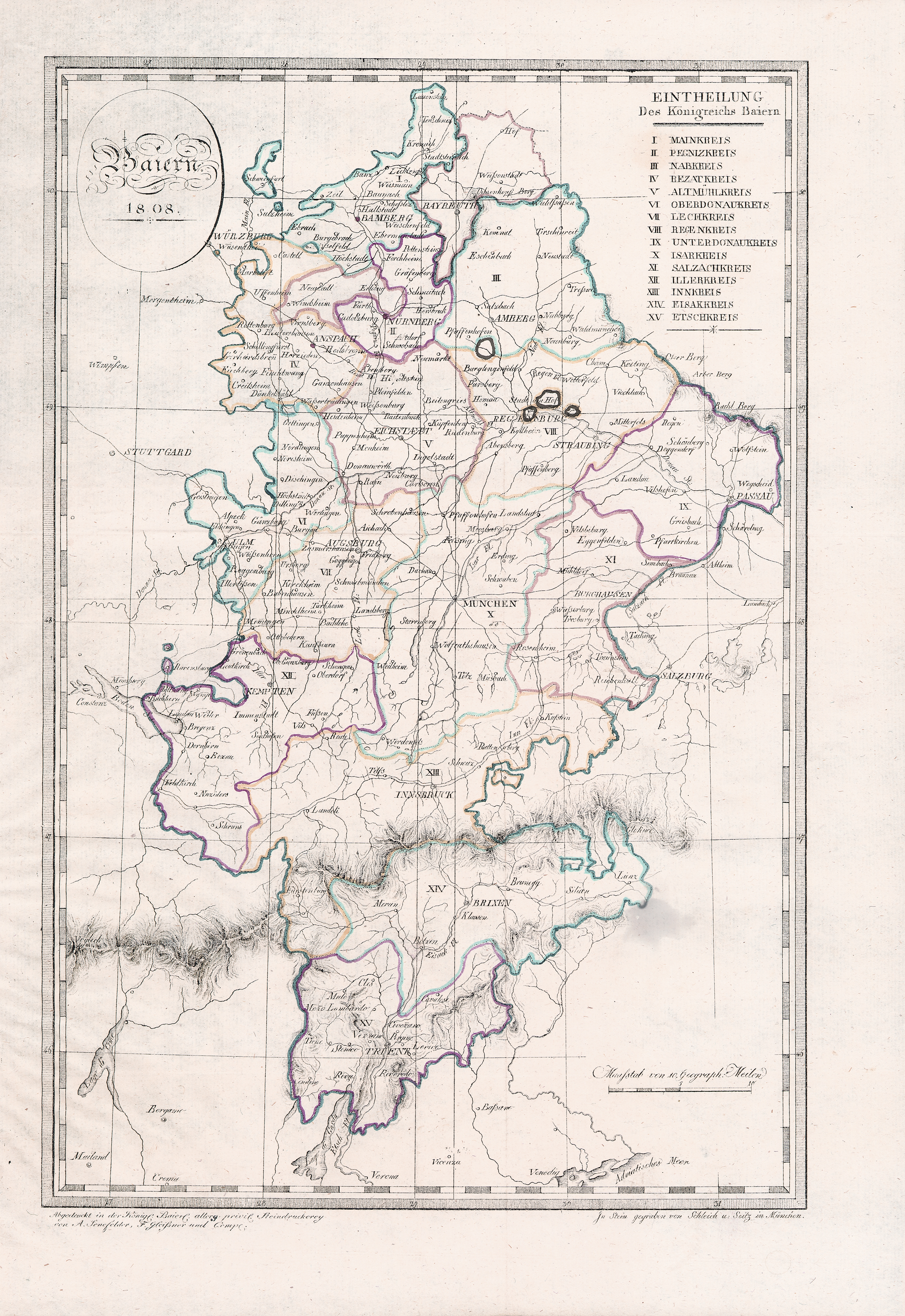
Districts of Bavaria, including Tyrol, in 1808

The Rezatkreis, between 1808 and 1837, was one of the 15 districts of the Kingdom of Bavaria. Its name meant in German the “District of the Rezat” because the Fränkische Rezat River ran through it. It was the predecessor of the Regierungsbezirks Mittelfranken (Administrative Regional District of Middle Franconia). Its center was Anspach.

== Independent cities ==
- Anspach
- Eichstätt
- Erlangen
- Fürth
- Nüremberg
- Schwabach

== Subdivisions ==
The district was divided in the following judicial districts (Landgerichte):

- Altdorf bei Nürnberg
- Anspach (outside the city)
- Markt Bibart
- Cadolzburg
- Dinkelsbühl
- Markt Erlbach
- Feuchtwangen
- Forchheim
- Gräfenberg
- Gunzenhausen
- Heilsbronn
- Herrieden
- Hersbruck
- Herzogenaurach
- Höchstadt an der Aisch
- Lauf an der Pegnitz
- Leutershausen
- Neustadt an der Aisch
- Nürnberger Land
- Rothenburg ob der Tauber
- Scheinfeld
- Uffenheim
- Wassertrüdingen
- Windsheim

== History ==
In 1808, the Kingdom of Bavaria was divided into 15 (administrative) districts, whose names were taken from the local rivers. The Rezatkreis was bordered in the north by the Bavarian Mainkreis (Obermainkreis after 1817), in the east by the Pegnitzkreis and the Altmühlkreis (until 1810), in the south by the Bavarian Oberdonaukreis and in the west by the Württemberger Jagstkreis. In 1817, the number of districts was reduced from eight to seven (with the Rheinpfalz). The Pegnitzkreis and the northern part of the former Altmühlkreis (which had belonged since 1810 to the Oberdonaukreis) were added to the Rezatkreis. Anspach was the district capital [Kreisstadt]. At the request of King Ludwig I, the Territorial Reorganization (Gebietsreform) was made on 29 November 1837. Consequently, on 1 January 1838, the Rezatkreis became Mittelfranken [Middle Franconia], one of the seven current Regierungsbezirke of the Kingdom and later State of Bavaria.

== Literature ==
- (de) Handbuch der bayerischen Ämter, Gemeinden und Gerichte 1799 - 1980 (Guide of the Bavarian Districts, Municipalities and Courts 1799 - 1980), written by Richard Bauer, Reinhard Heydenreuter, Gerhard Heyl, Emma Mages, Max Piendl, August Scherl, Bernhard Zittel and edited by Wilhelm Volkert, Senior Professor at the University of Regensburg, Munich, 1983, ISBN 3-406-09669-7
- (de) Prof. Dr. Karl Friedrich Hohn: Der Retzatkreis des Königreichs Bayern: geographisch, statistisch und historisch beschrieben [The Retzatkreis of the Kingdom of Bavaria: Described Geographically, Historically and Statistically]. Nuremberg, 1829

== Maps ==
- (en) Christoph Fembo (artist and editor), Johann W. Kneusel (engraver): Charte vom Rezatkreis. Mit der Eintheilung in Land- und Herrschafts-Gerichte. [Map of the Rezatkreis. With the Division of State and Local Subdivisions] Charter of Rezatkreis. With the division into land and domination courts] Nuremberg, 1819 (digitized image from the Universitäts- und Landesbibliothek Düsseldorf [University and State Library of Düsseldorf]).
