= Lower Danube Circle =

1808–1837 administrative district of the Kingdom of Bavaria

Unterdonaukreis
- Regierungsbezirk of the Kingdom of Bavaria
- 1808–1837
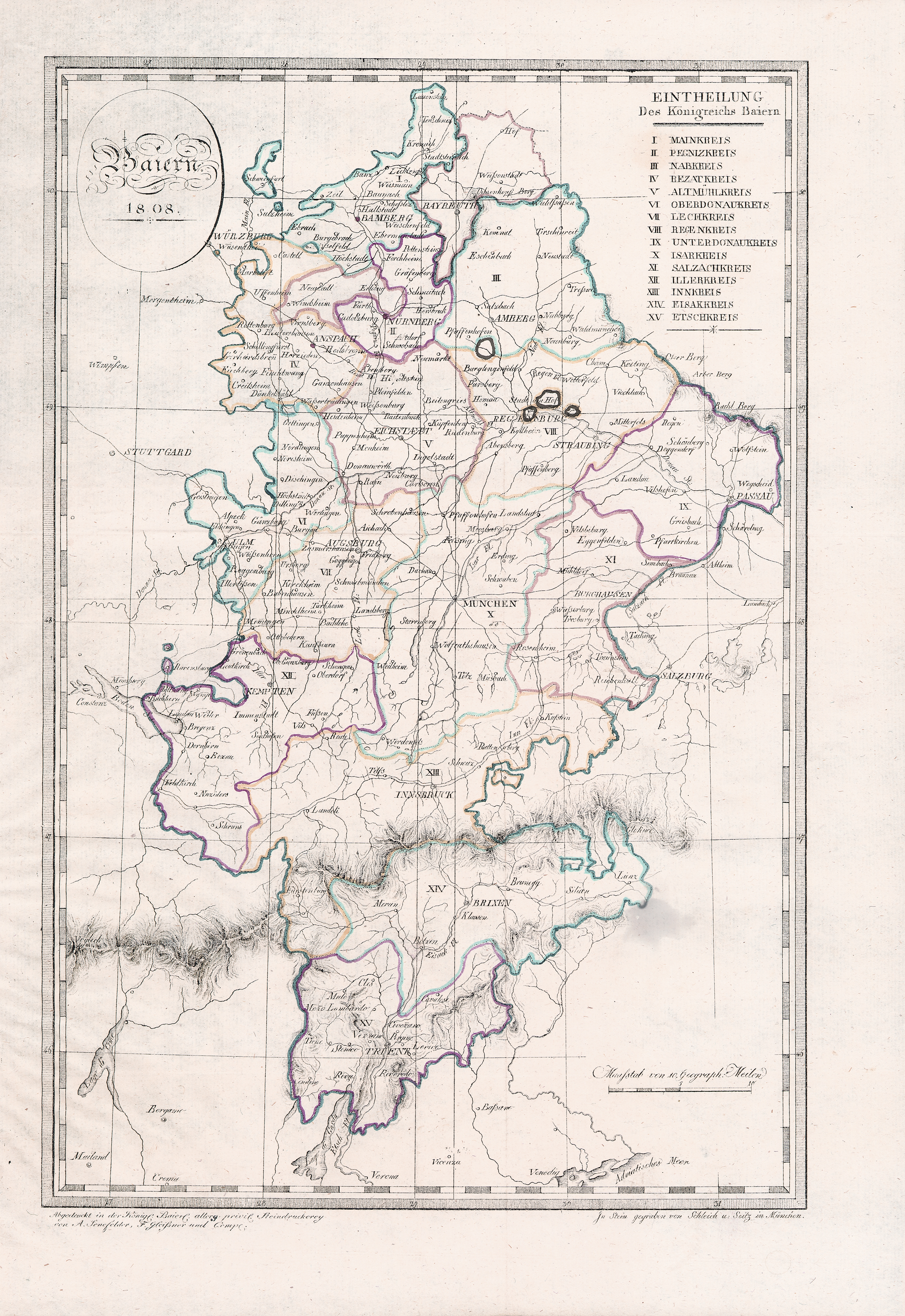
- Districts of Bavaria, including Tyrol, in 1808
- Capital: Passau
- Area transferred
  - 1810: Innviertel from Austrian Empire
  - 1816: Innviertel to Austrian Empire
- History
  - Established: 1808
  - Disestablished: 1837
Succeeded by
Lower Bavaria
Upper Bavaria
Upper Palatinate
Upper Austria
- Today part of: Bavaria

The Lower Danube Circle or Under Danube Circle (German: Unterdonaukreis) was one of the administrative districts (German: Bezirke or Regierungsbezirke) of the Kingdom of Bavaria between 1808 and 1837. It was named after its main river, the Danube and was the predecessor of the administrative district of Lower Bavaria (Regierungsbezirk Niederbayern). Its administrative headquarters were in Passau, but the appellate court was in Straubing.

== Independent cities ==
- Passau (since 1810)
- Straubing (since 1810)

== Subdivisions ==
The district was divided in the following judicial districts (Landgerichte), according to the original borders of the districts of the former territories (Herrschaftsgerichte):

- Deggendorf,
- Eggenfelden (since 1810),
- Grafenau (since 1811),
- Griesbach,
- Irlbach (since 1814),
- Landau,
- Mitterfels (since 1810),
- Obernberg (1810–1816),
- Passau,
- Pfarrkirchen,
- Regen,
- Schärding (1810–1816),
- Viechtach (since 1810),
- Vichtenstein (1810–1816),
- Vilshofen,
- Waizenkirchen (1810–1816),
- Wegscheid,
- Wolfstein.

== History ==
In 1808 the Kingdom of Bavaria was divided into 15 'circles'. Their names were taken from their main rivers. The Unterdonaukreis was initially composed of 10 rural divisions and, since 1809, of the independent city of Passau. In 1810, the Unterdonaukreis was enlarged. In another territorial reorganization initiated by King Ludwig I on 29 November 1837, the Unterdonaukreis again enlarged and renamed Lower Bavaria (Niederbayern). District headquarters were moved from Passau to Landshut.

== Literature ==
- (de) Handbuch der bayerischen Ämter, Gemeinden und Gerichte 1799 - 1980 (Guide of the Bavarian Districts, Municipalities and Courts 1799 - 1980), written by Richard Bauer, Reinhard Heydenreuter, Gerhard Heyl, Emma Mages, Max Piendl, August Scherl, Bernhard Zittel and edited by Wilhelm Volkert, Senior Professor at the University of Regensburg, Munich, 1983, ISBN 3-406-09669-7
