= Crescentia, Princess of Oettingen-Wallerstein =

19th-century German noblewoman

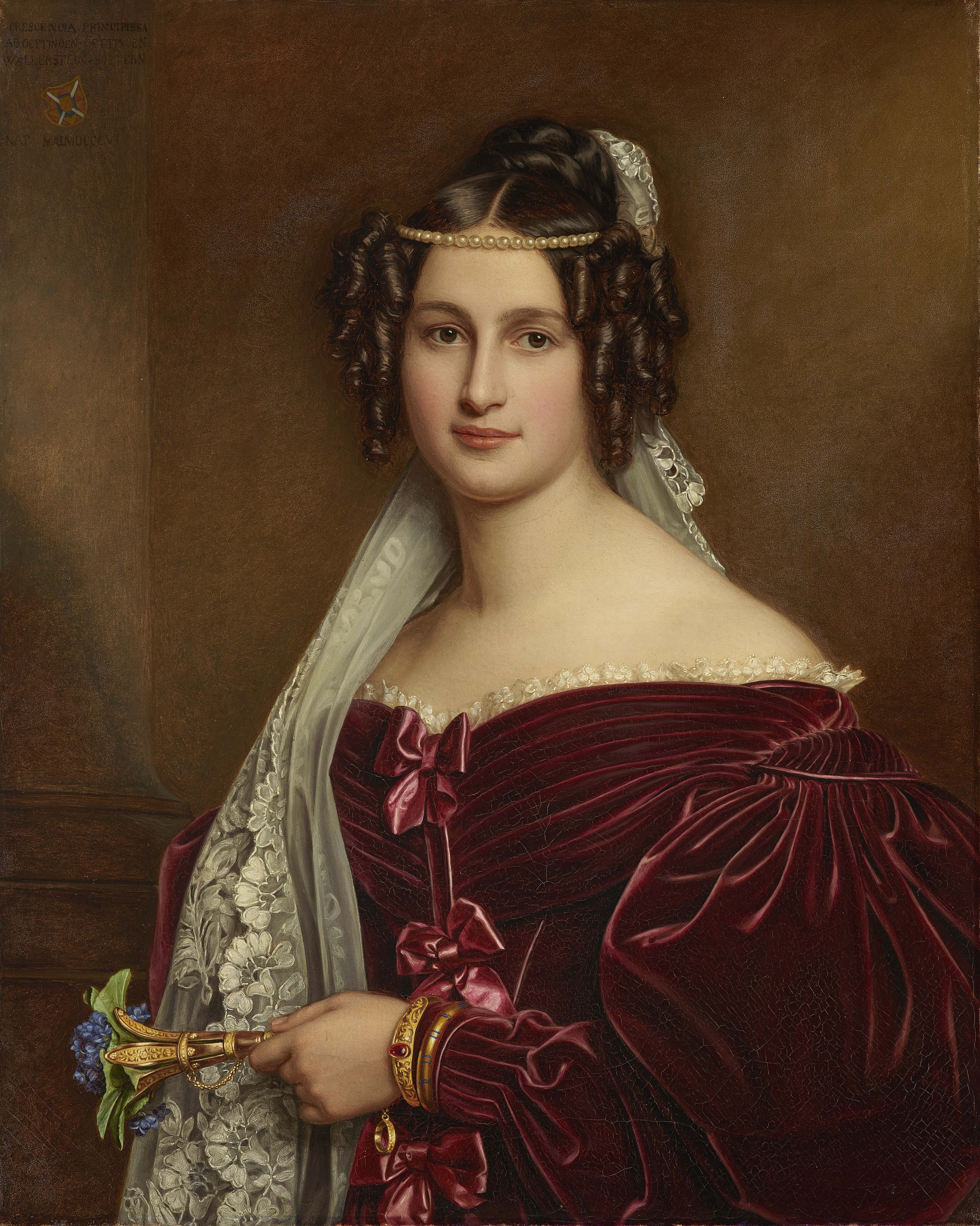
Maria Crescentia Bourgin as Princess of Öttingen-Öttingen and Öttingen-Wallerstein, with Öttingen-Wallerstein coat of arms, in a painting for the Gallery of Beauties, painted by Joseph Karl Stieler in 1836

Crescentia, Princess of Oëttingen-Wallerstein born Maria Crescentia Bourgin (3 May 1806 – 22 June 1853), was the wife of Prince Louis of Oettingen-Wallerstein.

== Life ==
Crescentia Bourgin was born in Füssen on 3 May 1806, the daughter of Nicolas Bourgin and his wife, Creszentia Glogger. From Burgundy, Bourgin rose to the position of court gardener to the Principality of Oettingen-Wallerstein at Baldern Castle.

On 7 July 1823 Crescentia Bourgin married the family's eldest son, Prince Louis Ernest Carl von Oettingen-Oettingen and Wallerstein (1791–1870). The couple had two daughters:

- Princess Caroline Antoinette Wilhelmine Friederike von Oettingen-Wallerstein (1824–1883), who married Count Hugo Philipp Waldbott-Bassenheim zu Buxheim and Heggbach (1820–1895)
- Princess Theresia Wilhelmine Frederike Creszentia von Oettingen-Wallerstein (1827–1833)

In 1802, Prince Louis of Oettingen – initially under the guardianship of his mother, Duchess Wilhelmine Friederike of Württemberg (1764–1817) – succeeded his father in the government of his small principality. In 1806 it was mediatized as the Holy Roman Empire came to an end. Prince Louis had a close friendship with the Bavarian Crown Prince Ludwig, later King Ludwig I. Prince Louis temporarily lost his position as Bavarian chief steward because of the inappropriate marriage, and within the family he had to renounce his birthrights.

Nevertheless, he not only managed to regain his crown office after Ludwig I came to power, his political career brought him, among other things, the office of Bavarian Ministry of the Interior in 1831, and in 1846/47 he was Bavarian envoy in Paris.

== Death ==
The Princess died age 47 on 22 June 1853, aged 47. Her body was buried in Maria Immaculata Monastery, Maihingen. Her husband, Prince Louis married secondly Countess Albertine Larisch von Moennich (1819-1900) and survived Maria Crescentia by 17 years.

== Portrait ==
In 1833, she appeared as one of the series of 36 portraits in the Gallery of Beauties gathered by King Ludwig I of Bavaria in 1836. Princess Crescentia and Prince Louis of Oettingen's daughter Caroline (married Count Hugo Philipp Waldbott von Bassenheim) was also portrayed by Joseph Stieler for this gallery in 1843. In 1836, Joseph Stieler created the present portrait for the occasion of the princess's May 3 birthday. It is based on the painting from 1833, but the character of the portrait is varied: the princess is now depicted with hair in ringlets, lace scarf, pearl band, low shoulder maroon gown, and lace tucker. In front of the dignified motif of a pillar architecture, the depiction is no longer a half-length portrait, but rather a half-length figure, which represents the forearm and the hand with the bouquet of Forget me not flowers.
