= Oberdonaukreis =

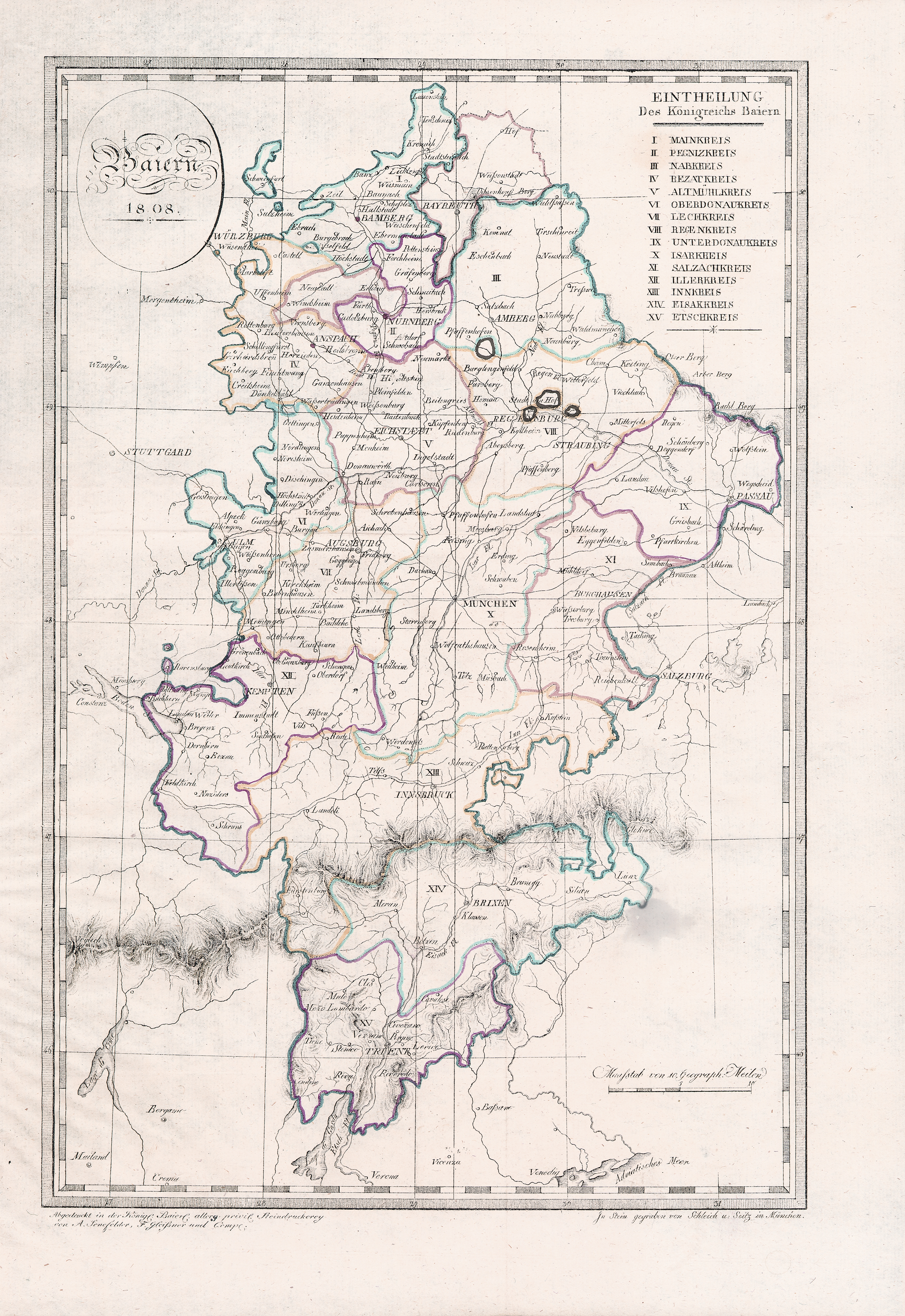
Districts of Bavaria, including Tyrol, in 1808

The Oberdonaukreis (German: Upper Danube District) was one of the 15 administrative districts (German: Bezirke or Regierungsbezirke) of the Kingdom of Bavaria between 1808 and 1837 named after its main river Danube. It was the predecessor of the Regierungsbezirk Schwaben (Administrative District of Swabia).

== Independent Cities ==
- Augsburg (since 1810)
- Donauwörth (since 1810)
- Eichstätt (since 1810)
- Ingolstadt (since 1810)
- Neuburg a.d. Donau (since 1810)
- Nördlingen
- Ulm (until 1810)

== Subdivisions ==
The district was divided in the following judicial districts (Landgerichte), according to the original borders of the districts of the former territories (Herrschaftsgerichte):

- Alpeck
- Beilngries (since 1810)
- Burgau
- Dillingen an der Donau
- Donauwörth (since 1810)
- Elchingen
- Ellingen (since 1815)
- Geislingen (until 1810)
- Göggingen (since 1810)
- Greding (since 1812)
- Günzburg (until 1810)
- Heidenheim (since 1810)
- Hiltpoltstein (since 1810)
- Höchstädt
- Ichenhausen (since 1816)
- Illertissen
- Ingolstadt (since 1810)
- Kipfenberg (since 1810)
- Lauingen
- Monheim (since 1810)
- Neuburg an der Donau (since 1810)
- Neumarkt (since 1810)
- Neu-Ulm (since 1811)
- Nördlingen
- Pleinfeld (since 1810
- Rain (since 1810)
- Raitenbuch (since 1810)
- Roggenburg (until 1810)
- Söflingen (until 1810)
- Wackerstein (since 1814)
- Weißenburg (since 1810)
- Wertingen
- Zusmarshausen (since 1810)

== History ==
In 1808 the Kingdom of Bavaria was divided into 15 districts. Their names were taken from their main rivers. The Oberdonaukreis, with Ulm as its capital, was initially composed of 12 rural divisions and, since 1809, of the independent cities of Ulm and Nördlingen. In 1810, the Oberdonaukreis was expanded but some territory was also given to the Illerkreis and to the neighbouring Kingdom of Württemberg. District headquarters were moved to Eichstätt and, in 1817, to Augsburg. In another territorial reorganization initiated by King Ludwig I on 29 November 1837, the Oberdonaukreis was renamed Swabia and Neuburg (Schwaben und Neuburg). Neuburg was soon dropped.

== Literature ==
- (de) Handbuch der bayerischen Ämter, Gemeinden und Gerichte 1799 - 1980 (Guide of the Bavarian Districts, Municipalities and Courts 1799 - 1980), written by Richard Bauer, Reinhard Heydenreuter, Gerhard Heyl, Emma Mages, Max Piendl, August Scherl, Bernhard Zittel and edited by Wilhelm Volkert, Senior Professor at the University of Regensburg, Munich, 1983, ISBN 3-406-09669-7
