= Regenkreis =

- Regierungsbezirk of the Kingdom of Bavaria
- 1808–1837
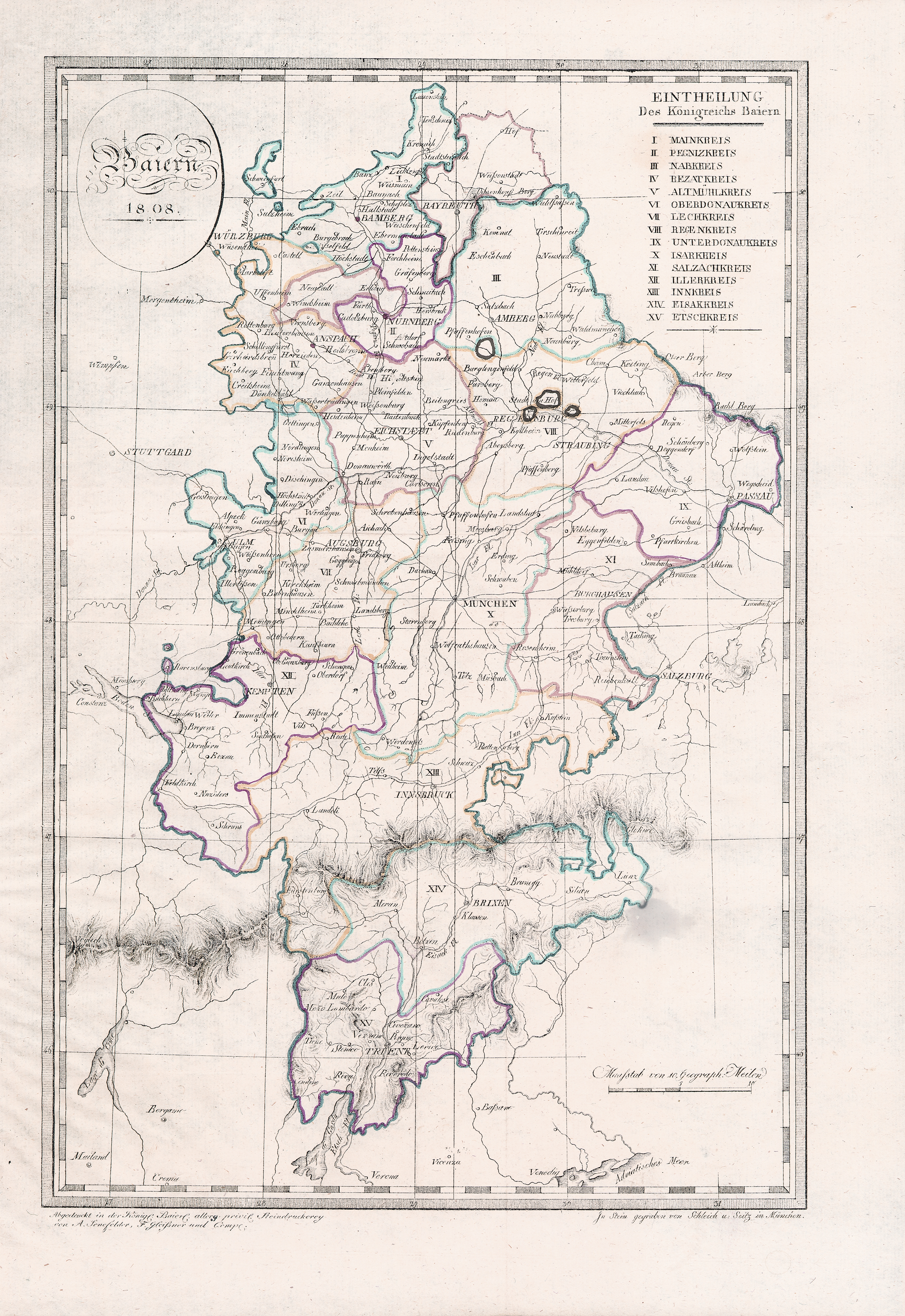
- Districts of Bavaria, including Tyrol, in 1808
- Capital: Straubing (1808–1810); Regensburg (1810–1937)
- History
  - Established: 1808
  - Disestablished: 1837
Preceded by	Succeeded by
Principality of Regensburg	Lower Bavaria; Upper Palatinate
- Today part of: Bavaria

The Regenkreis, with Straubing and later Regensburg as its capital, existed between 1808 and 1837 as one of the 15 districts of the Kingdom of Bavaria. In 1808, the Kingdom of Bavaria was divided into 15 (state) districts named after rivers. In English, Regenkreis means "District of Regen" and was named after the Regen River which flowed through the district. Regenkreis was the predecessor of the Regierungsbezirks Oberpfalz (Administrative Regional District of Upper Palatinate).

== Independent cities ==
- Amberg (from 1810)
- Regensburg (from 1810)
- Straubing

== Subdivisions ==
The district was divided in the following judicial districts (Landgerichte = LG), according to the original borders of the districts of the former territories (Herrschaftsgerichte = HG):

- Abensberg
- Amberg (from 1810)
- Barbing (briefly 1811)
- Burglengenfeld
- Cham
- Hemau
- Kastl (from 1810)
- Kelheim
- Kötzting
- Laberweinting HG (from 1814)
- Mitterfels
- Nabburg (from 1810)
- Neunburg vorm Wald (from 1810)
- Parsberg
- Pfaffenberg
- Regenstauf (from 1811)
- Riedenburg (from 1810)
- Roding (from 1814)
- Stadtamhof
- Straubing (until 1810)
- Sulzbach (from 1810)
- Viechtach
- Vohenstrauß (from 1810)
- Waldmünchen (from 1810)
- Wetterfeld
- Winklarn HG (from 1814)
- Wörth (an der Donau) LG (1811-1814, then HG)
- Zaitzkofen HG (from 1813)

== History ==
In 1808 the Kingdom of Bavaria was divided in 15 (state) districts, whose names were taken from their rivers. The Regenkreis was initially composed of 13 rural divisions and, since 1809, of the independent city of Straubing. In 1810 it was greatly enlarged to include the Principality of Regensburg. Thereafter Regensburg was the headquarters of the District Commissioners-General (Generalkreiskommissariats). But the Regenkreis also gave areas to the Unterdonaukreis. At the request of King Ludwig I, the Territorial Reorganization (Gebietsreform) of 29 November 1837 was made by changing the name of the Regenkreis to the “Kreis Oberpfalz und Regensburg” [District of the Upper Palatinate and Regensburg], now “Oberpfalz”.

== Literature ==
- (de) Handbuch der bayerischen Ämter, Gemeinden und Gerichte 1799 – 1980 [Guide of the Bavarian Districts, Municipalities and Courts 1799 - 1980], written by Richard Bauer, Reinhard Heydenreuter, Gerhard Heyl, Emma Mages, Max Piendl, August Scherl, Bernhard Zittel and edited by Wilhelm Volkert, Senior Professor at the University of Regensburg, Munich, 1983, ISBN 3-406-09669-7
