= Anna Hillmayer =

19th-century German woman

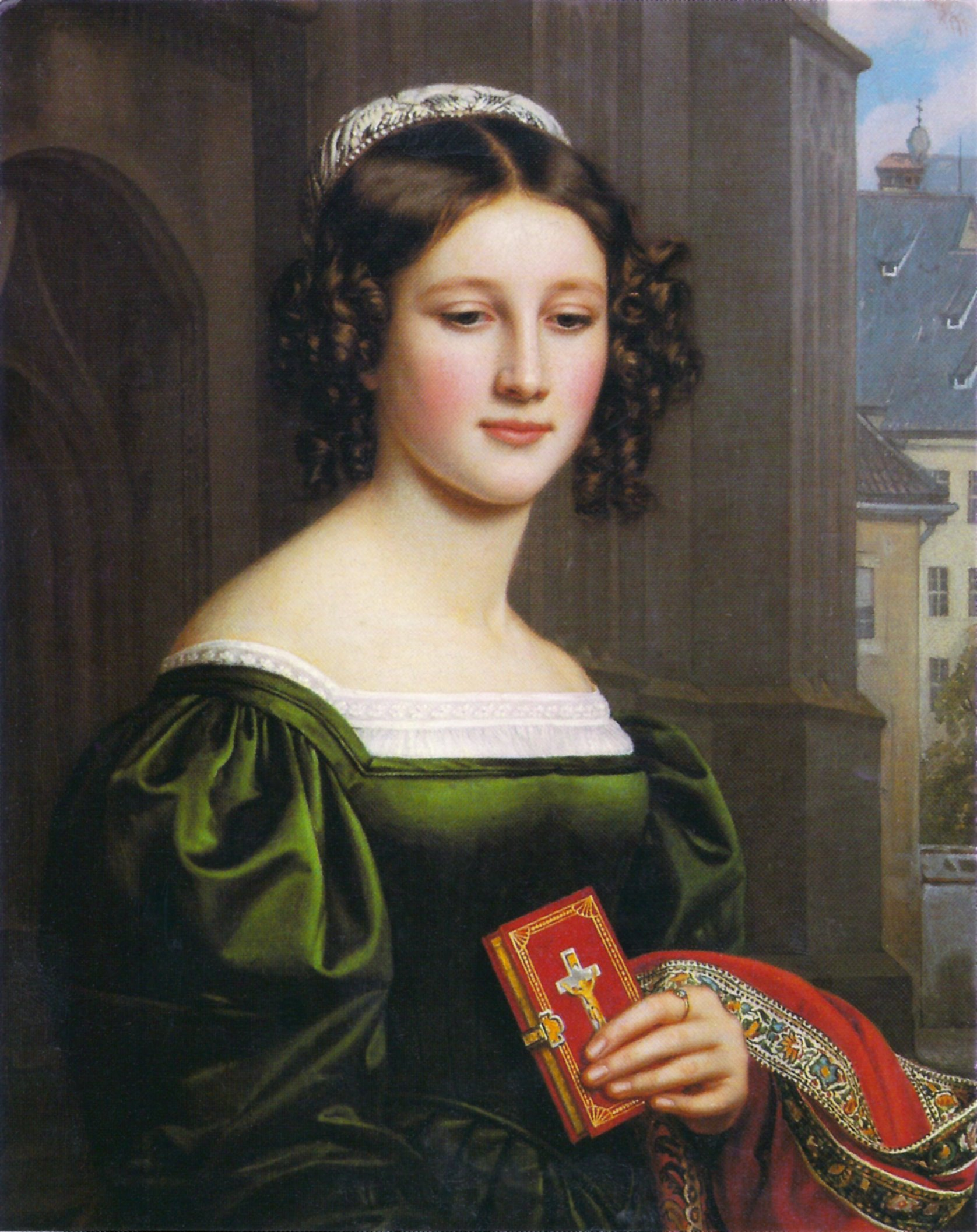
17-year-old Anna Hillmayer, in a painting for the Gallery of Beauties in 1829, painted by Joseph Karl Stieler

Anna Hillmayer (17 August 1812, Munich – 17 August 1847) was a Munich beauty whose portrait was included in the famous Gallery of Beauties of King Ludwig I of Bavaria.

== Life ==
Anna was born in Munich in 1812. She was the daughter of a Munich game meat dealer. She died unmarried on her 35th birthday in 1847.

== Portrait ==
Her portrait was begun in 1829 by Joseph Karl Stieler when she was 17 years old. It was the last of the first ten portraits that the artist painted for King Ludwig I of Bavaria and released for public viewing in the Gallery of Beauties. Helene Sedlmayr's portrait was completed later, but was released for public viewing before Anna's portrait.

She is shown wearing the traditional Munich headdress and holding a prayer book, in front of the Munich Frauenkirche. She also wears a dress similar to that worn by Nanette Kaulla.
