= Antonia Wallinger =

19th-century German woman

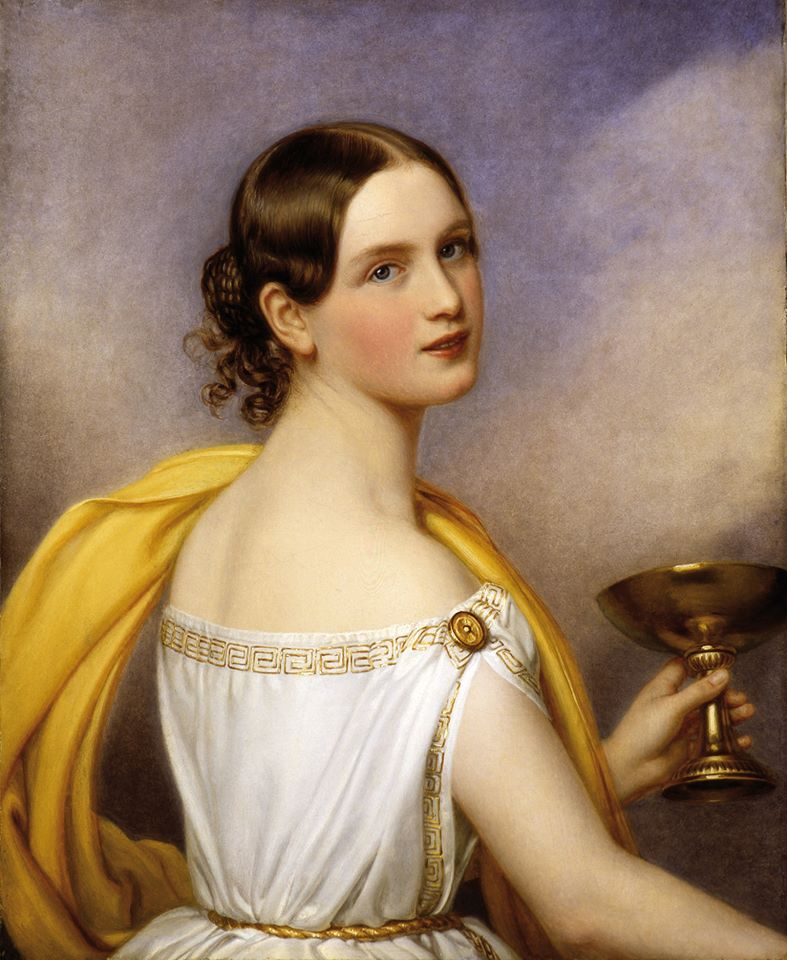
17-year-old Antonia Wallinger in a painting for the Gallery of Beauties in 1840

Antonia von Ott (née Wallinger; 7 April 1823, Munich – 24 March 1893) was a Munich royal court theater dancer whose portrait was included in the famous Gallery of Beauties of the Bavarian King Ludwig I.

== Life ==
Antonia Wallinger was born in 1823 at Munich, the daughter of the merchant Anton Josef Wallinger, later a court theater economist, and his wife Katharina, née Bayer.

== Portrait ==
In 1840, Ludwig I commissioned Joseph Stieler to paint her portraits for the Gallery of Beauties (today in Nymphenburg Palace). She is portrayed as Hebe, the Goddess of Youth and was described by King Ludwig I in his sonnet "Ode to the Hebe in My Collection of Beauties" as "a sweet cupbearer at a feast of the gods".

== Personal life ==
Around 1860 she married Friedrich von Ott, a government councilor. Her husband died around 1880. Thirteen years later she died in 1893.
