= Rosalie Julie von Bonar =

19th-century German woman

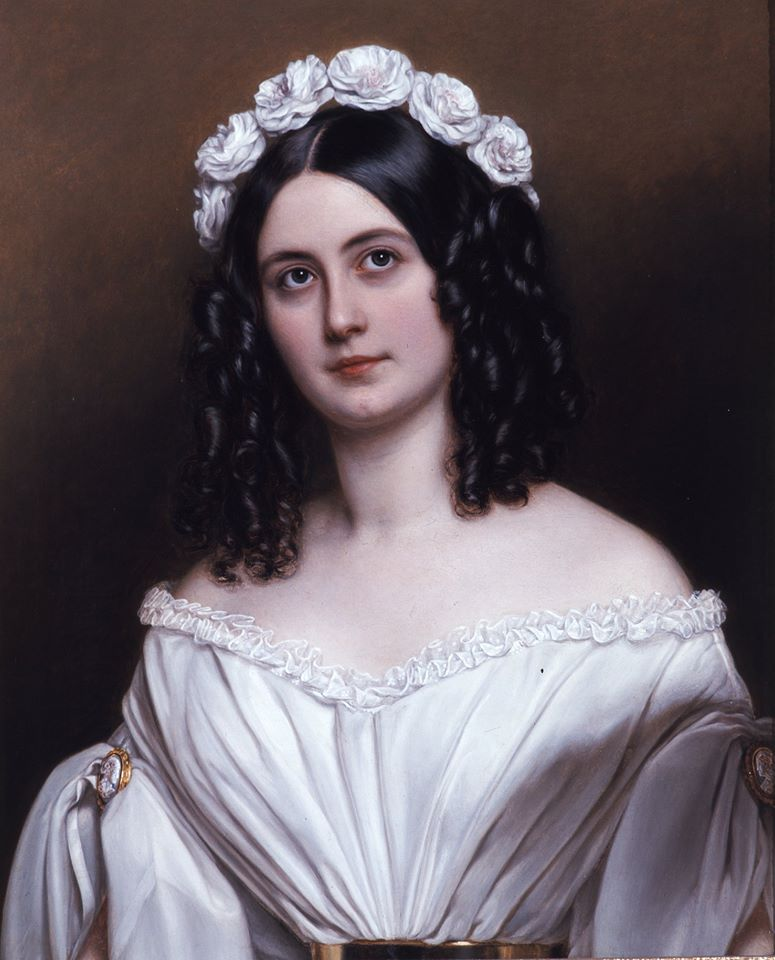
Baroness Rosalie Julie von Bonar in a painting for the Gallery of Beauties painted by Joseph Karl Stieler in 1840

Baroness Rosalie Julie von Bonar (1814, Vienna – ?) was an Austrian noblewoman. She appeared in the Gallery of Beauties gathered by Ludwig I of Bavaria in 1840.

== Life ==
Rosalie was the daughter of Morovian Imperial Chevalier Wüllerstorf-Urbair and his wife, Polish Countess Grohorska. She married the British ambassador to Vienna, Ernst, Baron von Bonar, in 1834 at the age of 20. Nothing else is known of her life.

== Portrait ==
Rosalie dresses in an old-fashioned style with a belt, natural waistline and a white flower crown in her portrait.
