= Maximiliane Borzaga =

19th-century woman

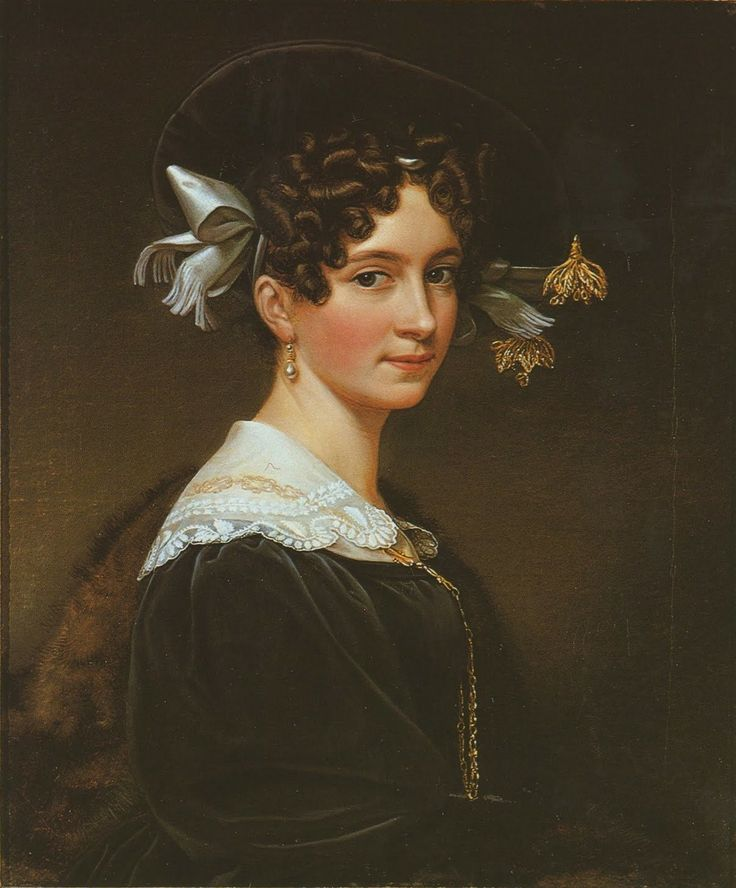
20-year-old Maximiliane Borzaga in a painting for the Gallery of Beauties in 1826

Maximiliane Borzaga (15 April 1806, Munich – 15 May 1837) was a Munich beauty of Italian descent, whose portrait was included in the famous Gallery of Beauties of the Bavarian King Ludwig I.

== Life ==
She was born in Munich in 1806. Her father was a saltworks and pawn shop cashier in Rovereto, Italy, who eventually settled in Rochus Lane in Munich, her mother was the daughter of the sacristan at the Salvatorkirche in Munich. The family lived on Rochusgasse next to the Trinity Church. In 1828 she married the doctor Karl Philipp Krämer in Kreuth. Together they had a son and a daughter. She died on 15 May 1837.

== Portrait ==
King Ludwig I of Bavaria wanted to pay visits home to “Miss Borzaga, daughter of the pawnshop manager, the most beautiful of Munich's beauties,” but her father wanted to prevent this because he was worried about his daughter's good reputation. The family only accepted admission to the King's Beauty Gallery on the condition that a companion was always present at the painting sessions. Her portrait was begun in April 1826 by Joseph Stieler when she was 20 years old and completed in June 1827. It was one of the first portraits that the artist painted for the king during his 27 years of work between 1823 and 1850. The king had her portrayed in a dark curly coiffure hairstyle, dark velvet dress trimmed with lace and fur. She wears a gold chain and a slanted hat with a silk bow. She radiates wealth and nobility. The portrait is an example of how King Ludwig I was enchanted by beauty, regardless of social barriers.
