= Auguste Strobl =

19th-century Bavarian beauty

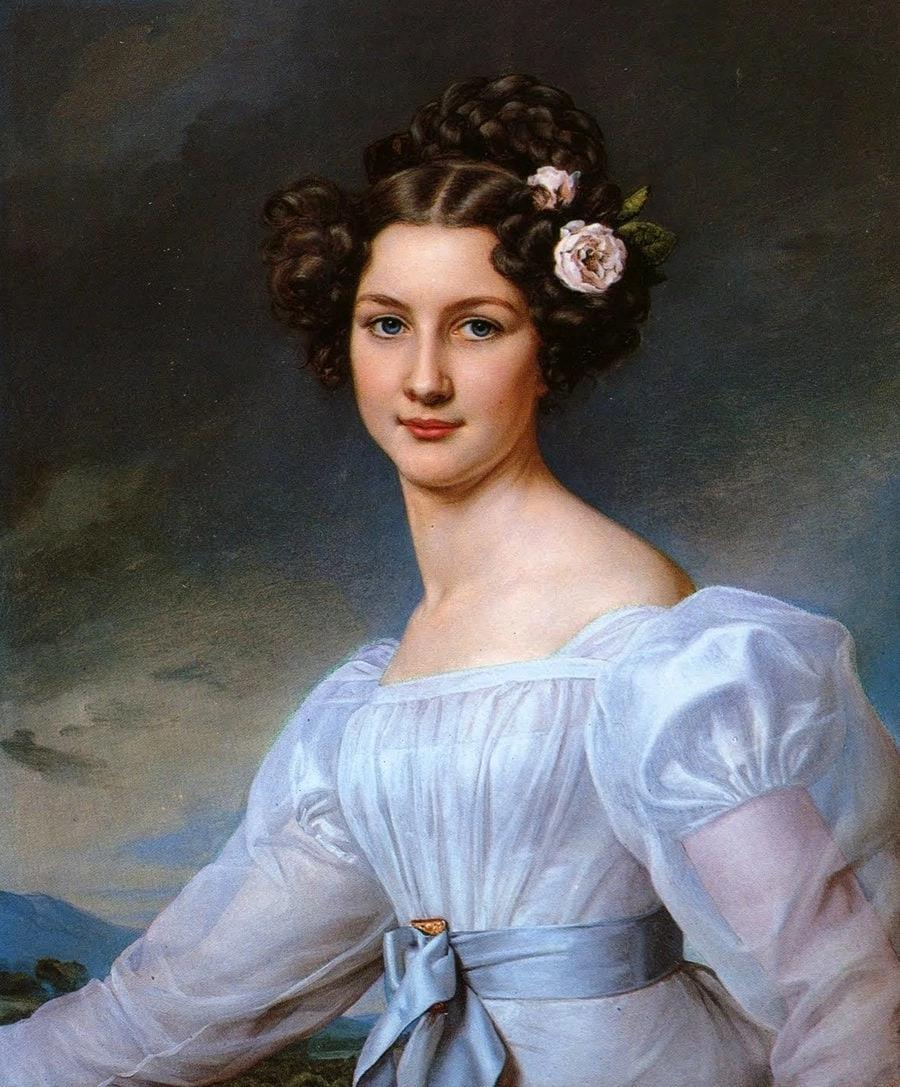
Auguste Strobl, December 1826, first version

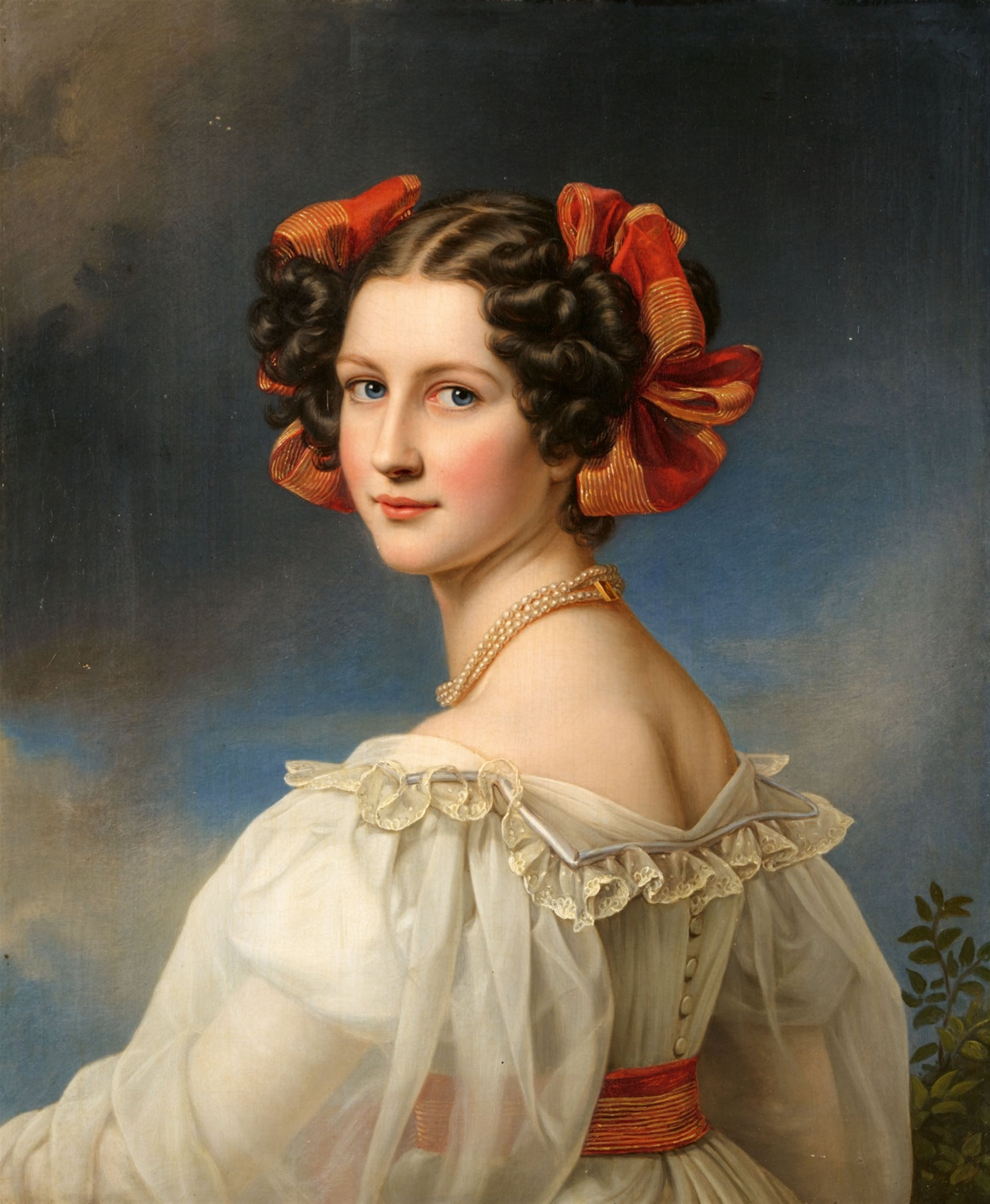
Auguste Strobl, January 1827, second version

Auguste Strobl (24 June 1807, Munich – 22 January 1871, Passau) was a Bavarian beauty of the 19th century. The daughter of a royal chief accountant, she also appeared in the Gallery of Beauties gathered by Ludwig I of Bavaria.

== Life ==
Auguste Strobl was the daughter of the royal Bavarian chief accountant Christoph Strobl and Maria Anna Josepha Schmid, who married in 1799.

At the age of 20, for unknown reasons, she caught the attention of King Ludwig I of Bavaria, whereupon he called her the most beautiful in his kingdom and dedicated poems and letters to her in which he adored her as the most gentle, the most beautiful, the most virtuous.

Since Ludwig I planned to build a collection of portraits of beautiful women of all classes that one could encounter on the street in his city of Munich, he had Auguste Strobl painted by his court painter Joseph Karl Stieler in December 1826 to paint. She became one of the first to be painted for the king's collection. However, the king was displeased with the result because Stieler had chosen a view that placed too much emphasis on Strobl's swan neck. Since Ludwig wanted Strobl's natural beauty to be documented, it was forbidden to subsequently shorten her neck in a painterly manner. Stieler had to paint her again in 1827; now the painter depicted the young lady facing inwards and looking out of the picture over her left shoulder, which results in an unusual rear view. The neck, which was too long, was also somewhat covered by a pearl necklace. Ludwig, who had briefly thought about accepting both pictures, then decided on the second picture, which became the start of the new gallery of beauties. The first picture from 1826 was lost. Possibly Ludwig gave it as a gift to Strobl. It only reappeared on the art market in 1976 and was purchased by the Residenzmuseum in Munich.

According to legend, Auguste Strobl asked the king to promote her fiancé, the forest service aspirant Anton Norbert Hilber, to district forester of Ergolsbach near Landshut, which happened on December 6, 1830. Both married on January 22, 1831, with the support of Ludwig and Auguste moved in with her husband in the Ergoldsbach forester's house. Auguste Hilber was the mother of five children, three sons and two daughters. The king visited her again in the district forestry office in 1835 and on this occasion wrote a final poem for her. It is possible that he brought her the first picture as a gift, but this has not been proven.

From 1836 to 1851 she lived with her family in Schönberg in the Bavarian Forest. King Ludwig is also recorded there in the parish registers as Ludwig Hilber's baptism witness. However, he was not personally present, but was represented. In 1851 Hilber was transferred to the Passau Forestry Office as forest master. Auguste Hilber died there in 1871 and is buried in the Innstadt cemetery. [1]

Auguste Strobl was, through her sister Amalia Strobl (1809–1865), the sister-in-law of the Innsbruck art dealer Franz Unterberger (1795–1867) and an aunt of the Austro-Belgian painter Franz Richard Unterberger.

== Reception of the portrait ==
The second portrait of Strobl by Stieler has become particularly famous: he shaped the delicate complexion, the fresh look, the sophisticated hairstyle and the white muslin dress of the young Munich woman into a portrait of great grace, which was obviously particularly impressive at the time it was created, so that Stieler painted at least three known versions in 1827 or 1828. The first version ended up in King Ludwig's gallery of beauties, a second version went to King William I of Württemberg (and in 2019 went to the art trade through private ownership) and a third version is now in the Hamburger Kunsthalle.

Among the portraits from Ludwig's Beauty Gallery, the portrait of Auguste Strobl achieved particular popularity because it was widely distributed in copies and more or less modified miniatures as early as the 19th century. Even today, the portrait is still often used as a motif for art prints or as a (sometimes kitsch) decoration for chocolate paper, beer mug lids, bags or as a cover motif on novels.

The portrait of Auguste Strobl prompted the comedy poet C. von Ploetz to write a poem entitled "An das Bildnis eines jungen Frauenzimmers um weißen Kleide" ("An image of a young woman in a white dress"), published in the magazine Flora in 1827.

== Bibliography ==
- Gerhard Hojer: Die Schönheitsgalerie König Ludwigs I. 2. neugestaltete Auflage, Schnell & Steiner, München 1983, ISBN 978-3-7954-1103-9
