= Carlotta von Breidbach-Bürresheim =

German noblewoman (1838–1920)

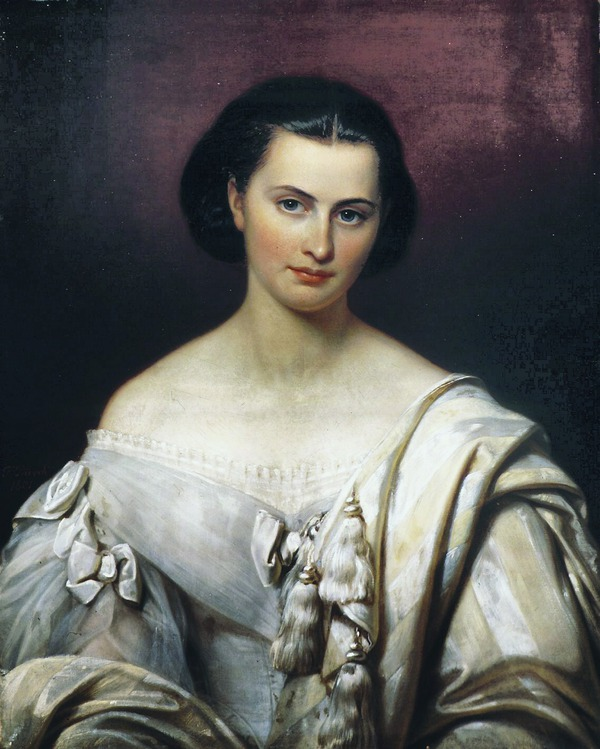
Carlotta von Breidbach-Bürresheim in a painting for the Gallery of Beauties, painted by Friedrich Dürck, 1863

Countess Carlotta von Boos-Waldeck born as Baroness Carlotta von Breidbach-Bürresheim (5 June 1838, Biebrich – 4 March 1920, Abbazia, then in Italy, today Croatia) was a German lady-in-waiting for Grand Duchess Mathilde of Hesse-Darmstadt. She appeared in the Gallery of Beauties gathered by Ludwig I of Bavaria in 1863. Her portrait was the last of the collection for the Gallery.

== Life ==
She was born in Biebrich on 5 June 1838, the daughter of Baron Philipp Jacob von Breidbach-Bürresheim and his wife Caroline, née Baroness von Greifenklau.

In 1858, as a lady-in-waiting for Grand Duchess Mathilde of Hesse-Darmstadt, Carlotta visited the court of Maximillian II in Munich, where she met Ludwig I, who had been widowed since 1854. He fell in love with the lady-in-waiting, whose portrait he had hung in the Gallery of Beauties and whose affection he tried to win with no fewer than 250 poems; However, she rejected a marriage proposal from the Bavarian ruler, who was 50 years her senior.

In 1863 she married Count Philipp Boos von Waldeck, with whom she lived in Bohemia and on an estate near Salzburg; the couple had six children.

She died in Abbazia in 1920.

== Portrait ==
In 1863, Ludwig I commissioned Joseph Stieler's nephew and student Friedrich Dürck (1809–1884) to paint her for the collection.

Baroness Carlotta wears a dress with neckline made straight by a modesty piece in the portrait.
