= Antonietta Cornelia Vetterlein =

19th-century woman

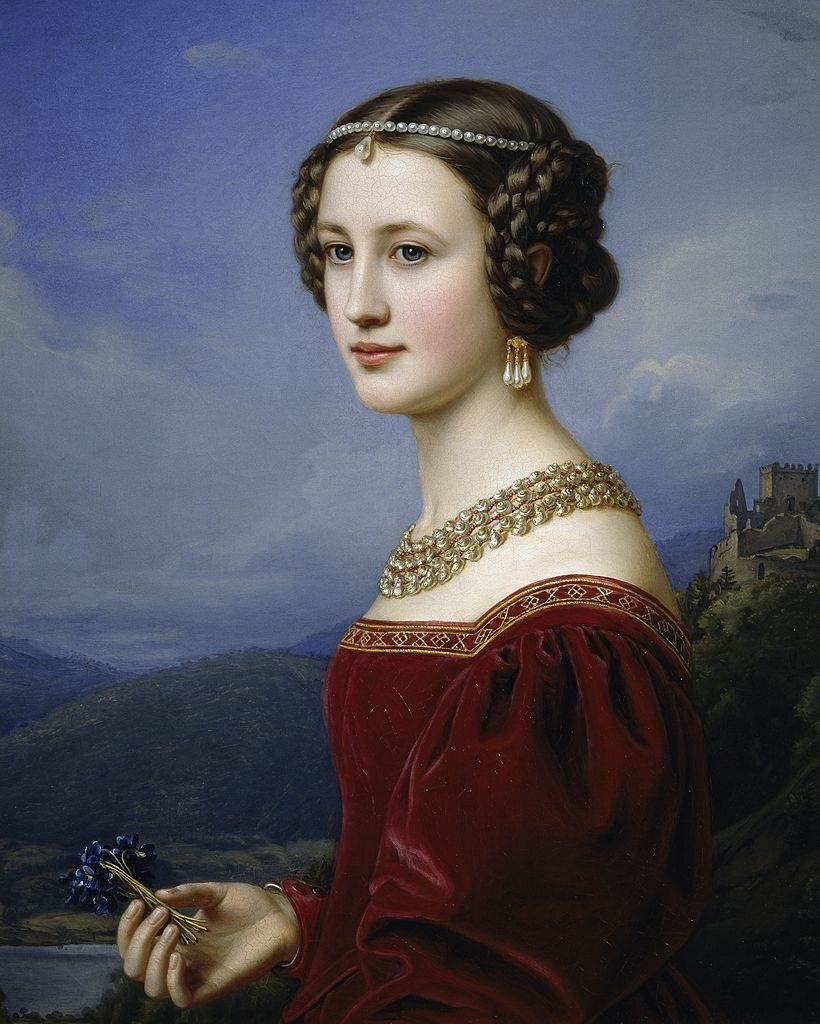
16-year-old Cornelia Vetterlein in a painting for the Gallery of Beauties

Antonietta Cornelia Vetterlein, Baroness von Künsberg (25 December 1812, Münchberg – 5 March 1862, Schmeilsdorf (Mainleus), was a Bavarian beauty of the 19th century. She was the granddaughter of Bayreuth Court Gardner Schneider and the daughter of State Councillor Vetterlein. She appeared in the Gallery of Beauties gathered by Ludwig I of Bavaria in 1828.

== Life ==
She was born on Christmas Day in Münchberg to Johann Karl Martin Vetterlein, the State Councillor and Rosaline Katrina Schneider. She died in 1862 in Schmeilsdorf, Upper Franconia.

== Portrait ==
In 1826, she attended the Royal Court Heigel as a student and attracted the attention of King Ludwig I of Bavaria. In 1828, the king commissioned the court painter Joseph Karl Stieler to paint her for his Gallery of Beauties collection in Nymphenburg Palace, Munich.

Most of the paintings in the Gallery of Beauties did not have significant backgrounds, but Cornelia symbolizes constancy and a castle is shown in the background. To match the castle, she is portrayed as the traditional German Lady of the Castle. The painting was completed in the same year when Cornelia was just 16 years old.

== Marriage ==
In 1843, she married Imperial Baron Franz Ludwig von Künsberg (1790–1860) with whom she had a daughter, Cornelia Carolina Rosalie Theresia Charlotte von Künsberg (1844–1962).
