= Friedrich Dürck =

German painter (1809–1884)

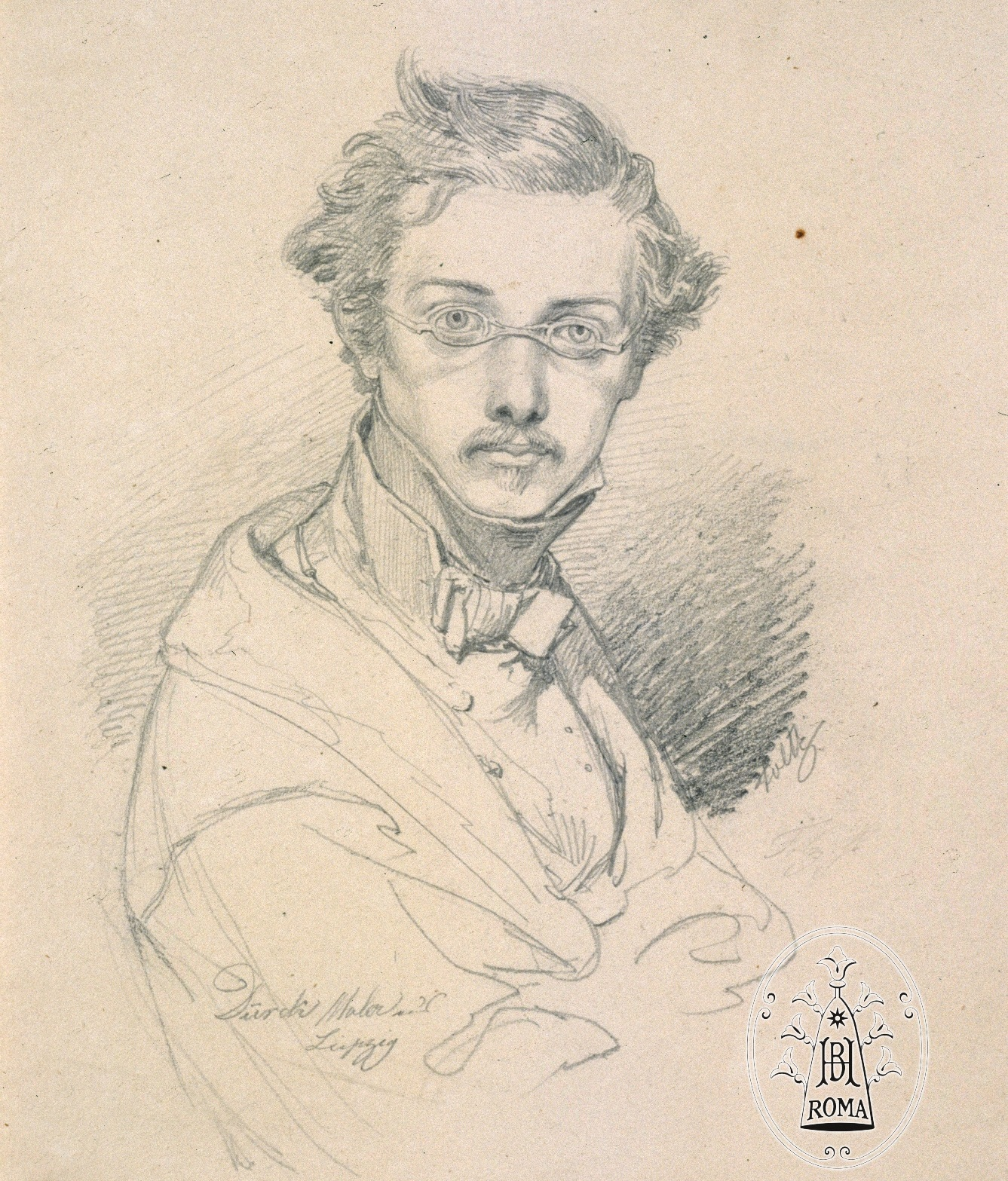
- Friedrich Dürck portrayed by Philipp Foltz
- Born: Friedrich Dürck; 28 August 1809; Leipzig, Kingdom of Saxony, Confederation of the Rhine
- Died: 25 October 1884 (aged 75); Munich, Kingdom of Bavaria, German Empire
- Spouse: Laura Stieler (m. 1840)
- Children: 3

Friedrich Dürck (28 August 1809 – 25 October 1884) was a Saxon painter.

== Life ==
Friedrich Dürck was the son of a wealthy merchant who lost his fortune in the post-Napoleonic turmoil through bad speculation and was finally happy to find work as an inspector of the royal hunting lodge Hubertusburg. Dürck, whose artistic imagination is said to have been awakened by a slightly injured soldier who was billeted with his family, initially received art lessons at the Leipzig Art Academy.

In 1822 his uncle, the royal Bavarian court painter Joseph Stieler, invited him to further his education in Munich under his direction. Although the then director Johann Peter von Langer initially considered him not mature enough for the Antiquities Hall, Stieler brought the young Dürck to the Munich Academy two years later.

Dürck enthusiastically studied oil painting and portraits and helped his uncle with his portraits until 1829. He copied well-known works by Stieler, such as the famous portrait of Goethe.

In 1828 he exhibited a portrait publicly for the first time and soon became a well-known painter in Munich. He travelled to Italy in 1836 and stayed in Rome and Florence until 1837. After his return to Germany he lived in Munich and portrayed numerous personalities of public life and the Bavarian court, including King Ludwig I in 1858. In 1849 he accepted an invitation to the Swedish court and in 1854 to the Austrian court.

After 1860 he mainly painted genre and costume pictures.

In 1861, Ludwig I commissioned Dürck to create two more portraits for the Gallery of Beauties in Nymphenburg Palace. This commission resulted in the only two pictures in the collection that were not created directly by Stieler: the portraits of Anna von Greiner and Carlotta von Breidbach-Bürresheim.

Some of Dürck's works can now be found in the Weimar art collections, which are supported by the Klassik Stiftung Weimar.

Friedrich Dürck died in Munich in 1884 at the age of 75. He was buried in Munich's Alter Südfriedhof Cemetery (grave field 14 – row 1 – place 32).

== Selected portraits ==
Christmas eve, before 1884.

A Neapolitan Woman, 1876.

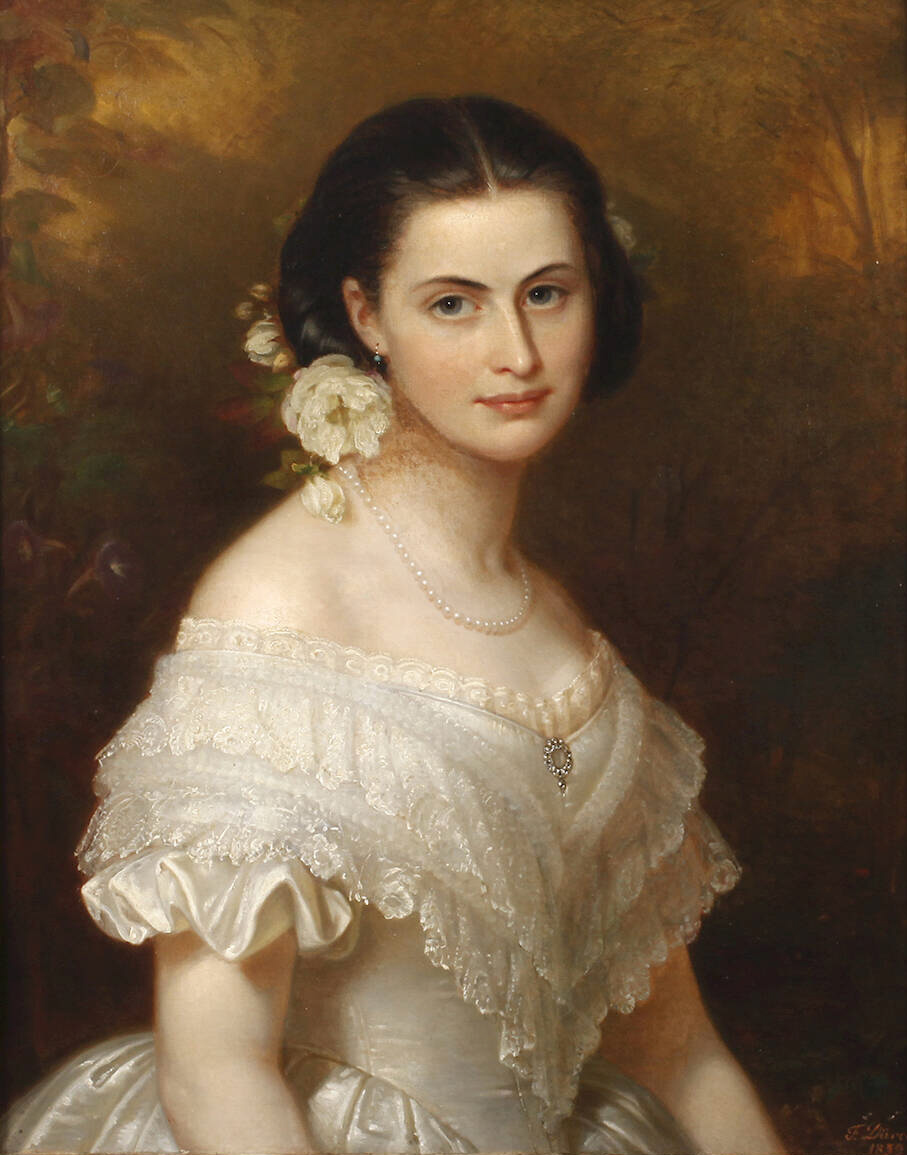
Portrait of Carlotta Baroness von Breidbach-Bürresheim (originally created as Dürck's portrait for the Gallery of Beauties of King Ludwig I.), 1859.

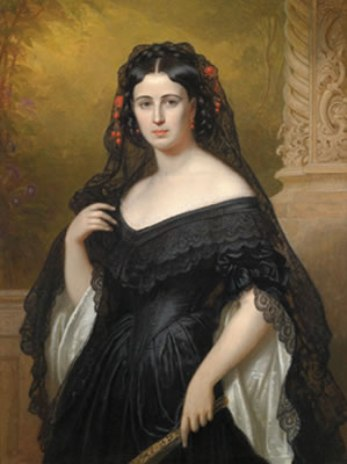
Potrait of Henriette Mendel (1833-1891)

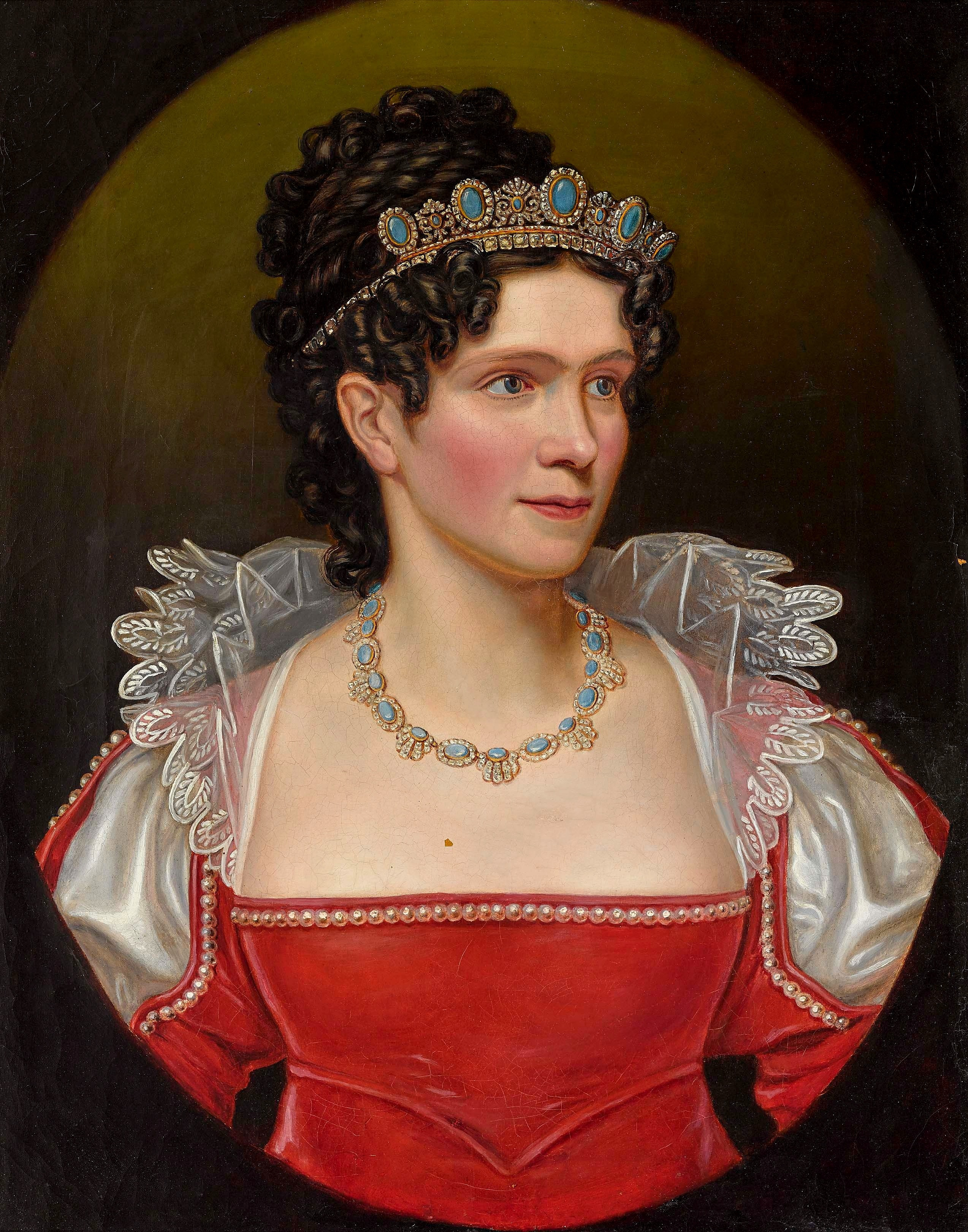
Caroline of Baden, Queen of Bavaria (After Joseph Karl Stieler)
