= Caroline Lizius =

19th-century German soprano

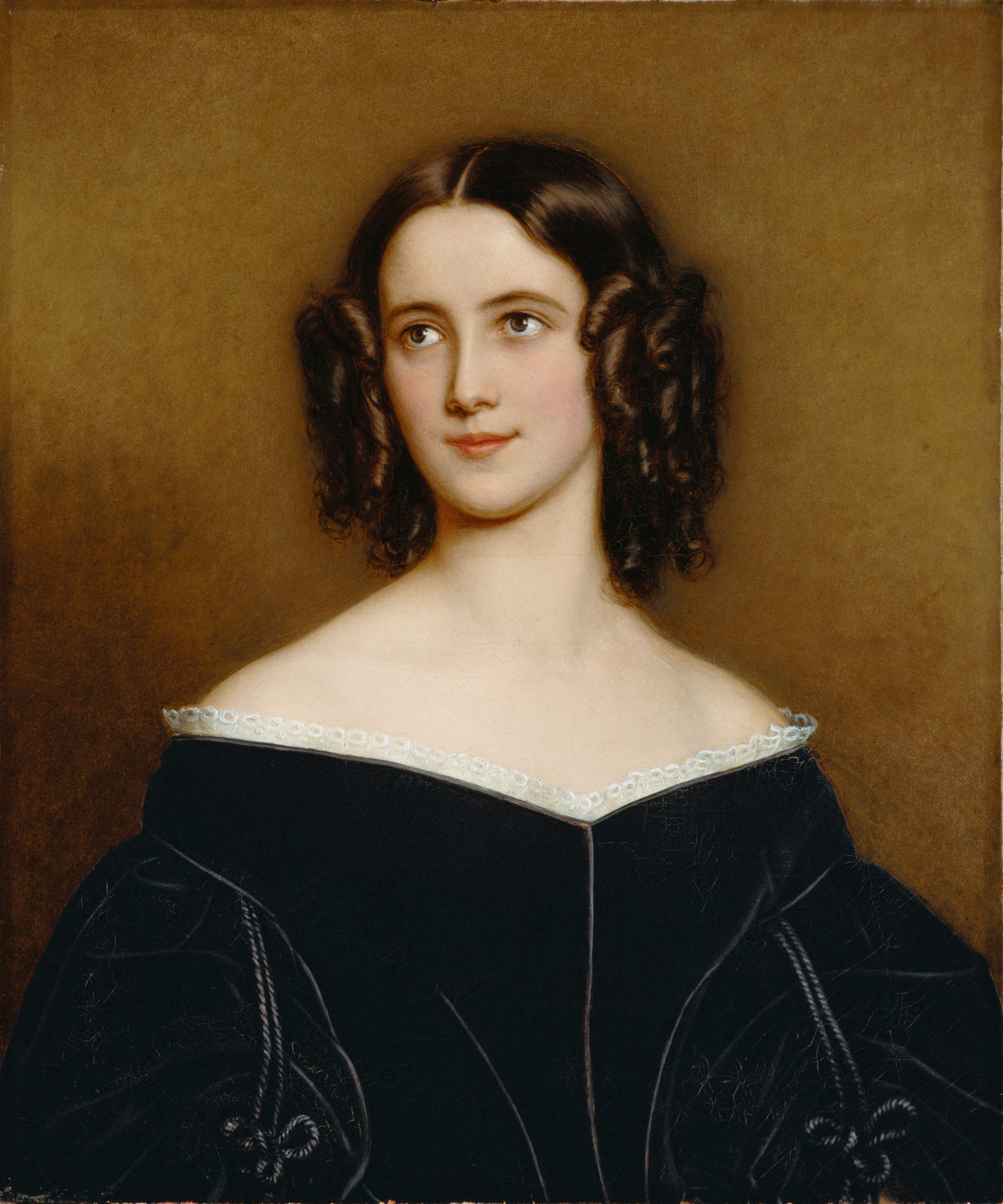
17 years old Caroline Lizius in a painting for the Gallery of Beauties, painted by Joseph Karl Stieler in 1842.

Caroline Lizius (24 March 1824, Aschaffenburg – 11 December 1908, Köln) was a German soprano in the Munich court music between 1844 and 1848. She also appeared in the Gallery of Beauties gathered by King Ludwig I of Bavaria in 1842.

== Life ==
Caroline was born in Aschaffenburg in 1824 to Christoph Franz Lizius and Catharina Sodi. Her father was appointed as a Royal Bavarian court musician and worked as a music teacher (singing, violin) at the music school of the royal study institutions (lyceum, high school and Latin school) from 1819/20 to 1840/41.

When Caroline was sixteen, she met King Ludwig I of Bavaria for the first time. A short time later, she moved to Munich, where her life was financed by the king. Her father and brother also had careers during this time. The king had Joseph Karl Stieler paint her as early as 1841 and Ludwig immediately commissioned a second in 1843 as Caroline "had become more beautiful". The first portraits of her - a youthful one and the second one in a dark velvet. The king also left her "24000 gulden (over 3 million dollars) in his will if she never married, which was to be used as a dowry if she did marry."

In 1849, Caroline eventually married a legation councilor and had a son, believed to be the king's son. Lola Montez and Caroline Lizius knew each other but did not like each other. The king had promised Lola that he would only see Caroline in her presence.
