= Irene Pallavicini =

19th-century Hungarian-born noblewoman

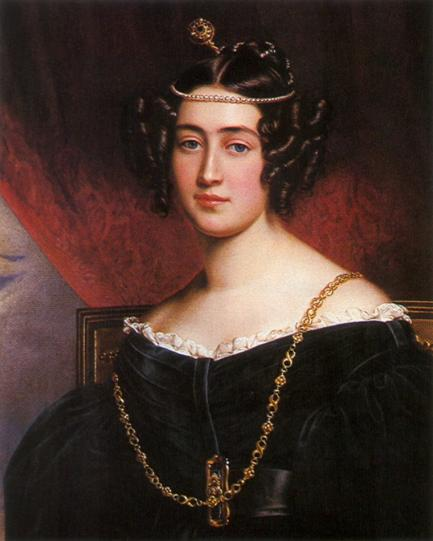
Irene Pallavicini in a painting for the Gallery of Beauties, painted by Joseph Karl Stieler in 1834.

Countess Irene von Arco-Stepperg (née Pallavicini; 2 September 1811, Algyő – 31 January 1877, Vienna) was a Hungarian-born noblewoman in the royal court at Munich. She appeared in the Gallery of Beauties gathered by King Ludwig I of Bavaria in 1834.

== Life ==
Marquise Irene of Pallavicini was born in Algyő, Kingdom of Hungary, on 2 September, 1811. She was the only daughter of Marquis Eduard Pallavicini and his wife Countess Joséphine Hardegg auf Glatz. Her father subsequently elevated the position of the Pallavicini family through the purchase of Hungarian assets and was awarded Hungarian citizenship and nobility rights in 1803, as well as the Bohemian and Moravian rights and the Fideikommiss in the Austrian Hereditary Lands.

She married Aloys Nikolaus Ambros, Count von Arco-Stepperg, the royal Bavarian chamberlain and son of Archduchess Maria Leopoldine of Austria-Este, and they spent much of their time on her family lands in Austria, and at Castle Anif, near Salzburg. Her marriage was childless and ended in separation, but not divorce.

Irene died in 1877 at Vienna.

== Portrait ==
In 1834, King Ludwig I of Bavaria commissioned the court painter Joseph Karl Stieler to paint the 23-year-old Marquise for his Gallery of Beauties collection in Nymphenburg Palace, Munich.

Marquise Irene is dressed in the same style as Princess Crescentia of Öttingen-Öttingen and Wallerstein, but with an unusual hair ornament and a jeweled belt buckle.
