= Elise List =

German singer (1822–1893)

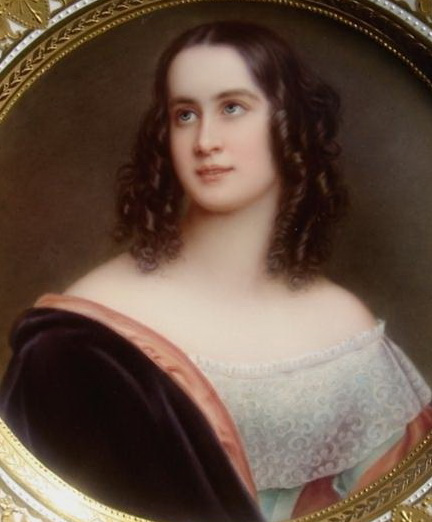
Twenty-year-old Elise List in a painting for the Gallery of Beauties, painted by Joseph Karl Stieler in 1842

Elise Friederike Mathilde List (1 July 1822, Stuttgart – 4 January 1893 Munich) was a German singer and friend of Clara Schumann, Robert Schumann, Felix Mendelssohn, and Franz Liszt, who was enamored of her appearance. She appeared in the Gallery of Beauties gathered by King Ludwig I of Bavaria in 1842.

== Life ==
Elise List was born in Stuttgart as the second daughter of National Economist Friedrich List, one of the best known German economists, and Karoline Neidhard, daughter of the poet David Christoph Seybold.

In 1833, Elise and her family moved to Leipzig. They had been living in Tübingen and Stuttgart and also spent several years in the United States, where they became friends of pianist and composer Clara Schumann and her husband Robert.

During their time in Leipzig, Elise attracted attention with her voice, which she had trained in Paris from a young age. Franz Liszt was one of her admirers. Felix Mendelssohn recommended further training of her voice; the Schumanns were also enthusiastic about Elise's soprano.

In 1840, Elise received an engagement at the Leipzig Gewandhaus concert hall, but she was unable to combat her stage fright. In the winter of 1842/43, a last-ditch attempt was made in Berlin—but, there also, her success was limited.

== Portrait ==
Elise was introduced to the king by his stepsister Queen Elisabeth Ludovika of Prussia, who told Ludwig "She sang for us with a very beautiful voice but her face pleased me even more than her singing and I think she would be worthy of being included in your collection of beauties."

In 1843, the king commissioned Joseph Karl Stieler to paint a portrait of her for the Gallery of Beauties Nymphenburg Castle. At that time, Elise met the widowed Austrian industrialist Gustav Moriz Pacher von Theinburg in Bad Ischl, whom she married on 27 March 1845. Their first daughter Leontine Meta died after only four days. In 1847 and 1848, the children Hedwig Emilie and Friedrich "Fritz" were born, and in 1852, a daughter, Cäcilie "Cilla" Karoline Katharina was born.

Elise's husband died of typhoid fever on 25 January 1852, after which Elise and her children moved to Munich.

Possibly due to the loss of her daughter in 1879, Elise fell ill for a long period of time. Although her condition improved in 1891, she died of pneumonia in 1893.
