= Regina Daxenberger =

19th-century woman

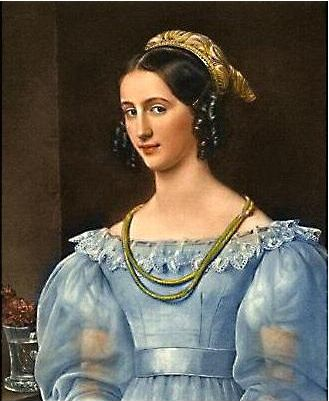
18-year-old Regina Daxenberger in a painting for the Gallery of Beauties in 1829

Regina Daxenberger (2 January 1811, Munich – 16 November 1872) was the daughter of coppersmith Matthäus Daxenberger. Her portrait was included in the famous Gallery of Beauties of the Bavarian King Ludwig I. The king considered her so beautiful that he arranged for her to open a royal ball on the arm of Duke Maximillian of Bavaria, accompanied by the first four royal couples.

== Life ==
Regina Daxenberger was born on 2 January 1811 in Munich. She was the daughter of coppersmith Matthäus Daxenberger and Maximiliane, née Leuthner. She had an older brother, Sebastian Franz von Daxenberger, who was a lawyer, writer, politician and a friend of Crown Prince and later King Maximilian II of Bavaria.

== Portrait ==
In the portrait, she wears the traditional Munich headdress, waist band, natural waistline and a lapel covering part of her big sleeves. A carnation in the background (not visible due to cropping) symbolizes loyalty.

She married the royal cabinet secretary Heinrich Fahrmbacher in 1832. She died in 1872.
