= Mathilde von Jordan =

19th-century noblewoman

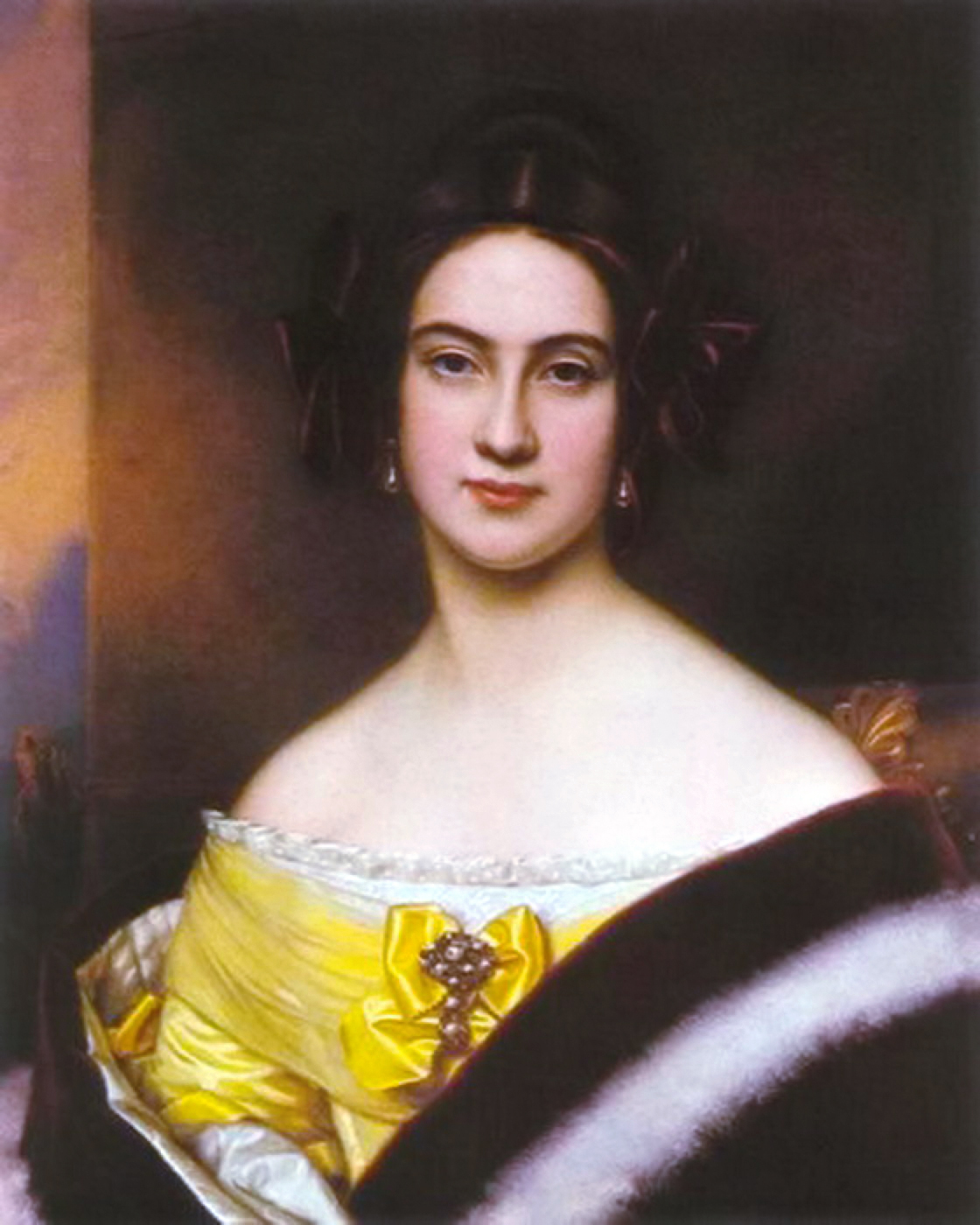
20 years old Mathilde von Jordan in a painting for the Gallery of Beauties in 1837.

Baroness Mathilde von Jordan (12 April 1812, Regensburg – 1886, Regensburg) was a German noblewoman who appeared in the Gallery of Beauties gathered by Ludwig I of Bavaria in 1837.

== Life ==
Mathilde was born in Regensburg in 1817. She was the only daughter of Baron Wilhelm von Jordan, royal chamberlain and lieutenant general, and Violanda, née Countess von und zu Sandizell. Mathilde was a dame of honor of the royal Order of Theresa.

In 1843 she married Count Friedrich Ferdinand von Beust (1809–1886). Beust was Foreign Minister of the Kingdom of Saxony from 1849 to 1866. From 1866 to 1871 he was Foreign Minister of Austria-Hungary, and at one time also Austrian Prime Minister. He received the title of hereditary Austrian count in 1868. Mathilde and her husband had three sons and a daughter. Countess Beust died in 1886.

== Portrait ==
In 1837, King Ludwig I of Bavaria commissioned the court painter Joseph Karl Stieler to paint her for his Gallery of Beauties collection in Nymphenburg Palace, Munich.

In the portrait, detail-enhancement shows the sides of her head are adorned with ribbon-work rather than curls; the later 1830s was an era of straight coiffures.
