= Josepha Conti =

Bavarian servant and painting subject (1825–1881)

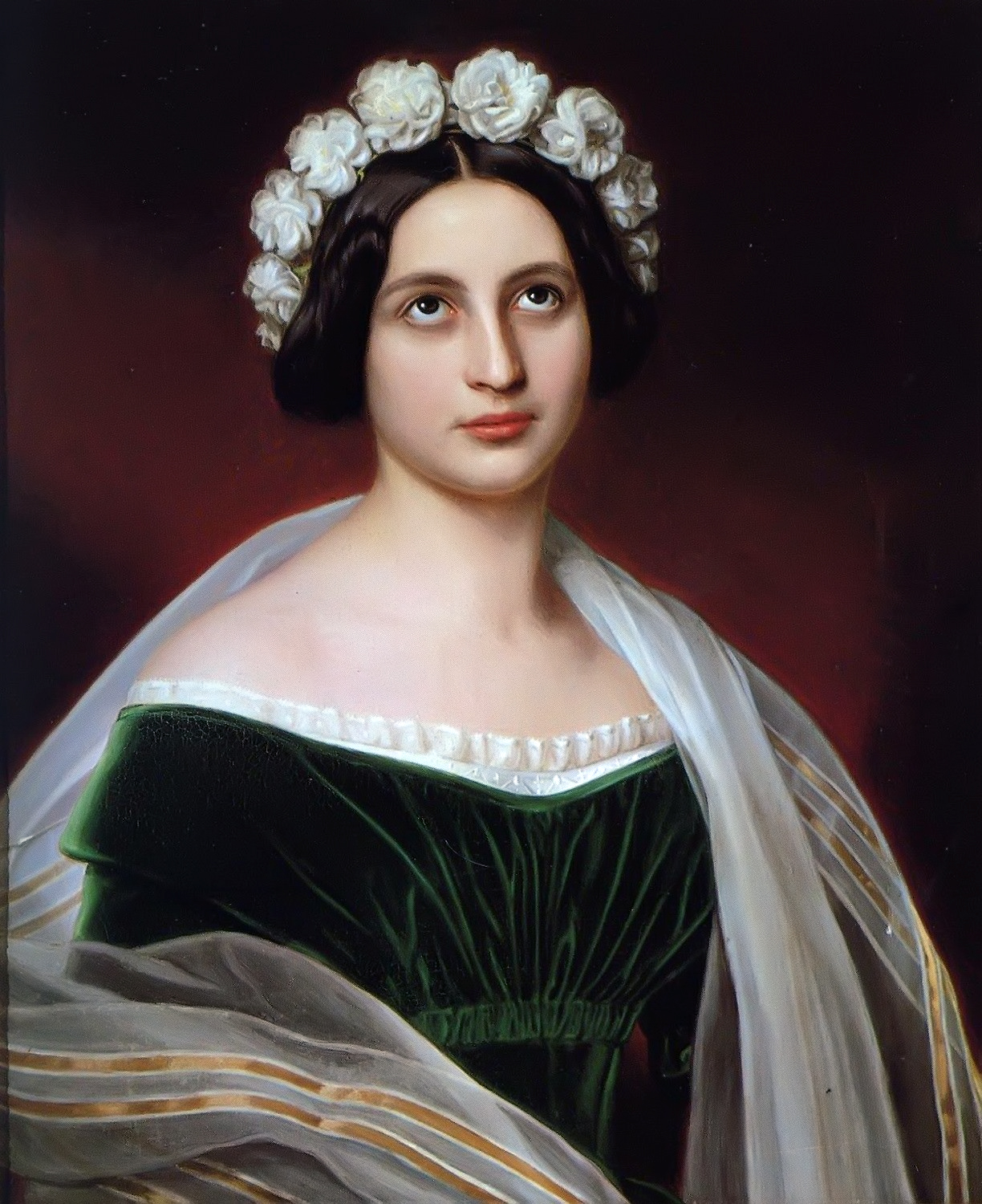
Josepha Conti's portrait, painted in 1844 by Joseph Karl Stieler, in the Gallery of Beauties.

Josepha Conti née Josepha Reh (17 February 1825 – 28 November 1881) was a Bavarian servant and beauty of the 19th century.

== Life ==
Born in Munich as the eldest daughter of the household servant Michael Reh, she was married aged 15 to a 45-year-old painter Anton Conti in 1840. They lived on Briennerstrasse in Munich, near the Royal Residenz, thus becoming known to Ludwig I of Bavaria, who included her in his Gallery of Beauties. Her husband had left her by 1845, but she then worked (from 1850 to 1852) as a maker of canvases for the royal court. In 1856, she married Anton Schirsner, District Council in the Munich district of Au, with whom she had a child.

== Sources ==
- https://www.flickr.com/photos/1way/713081448/
