= Maria Dietsch =

19th-century German woman

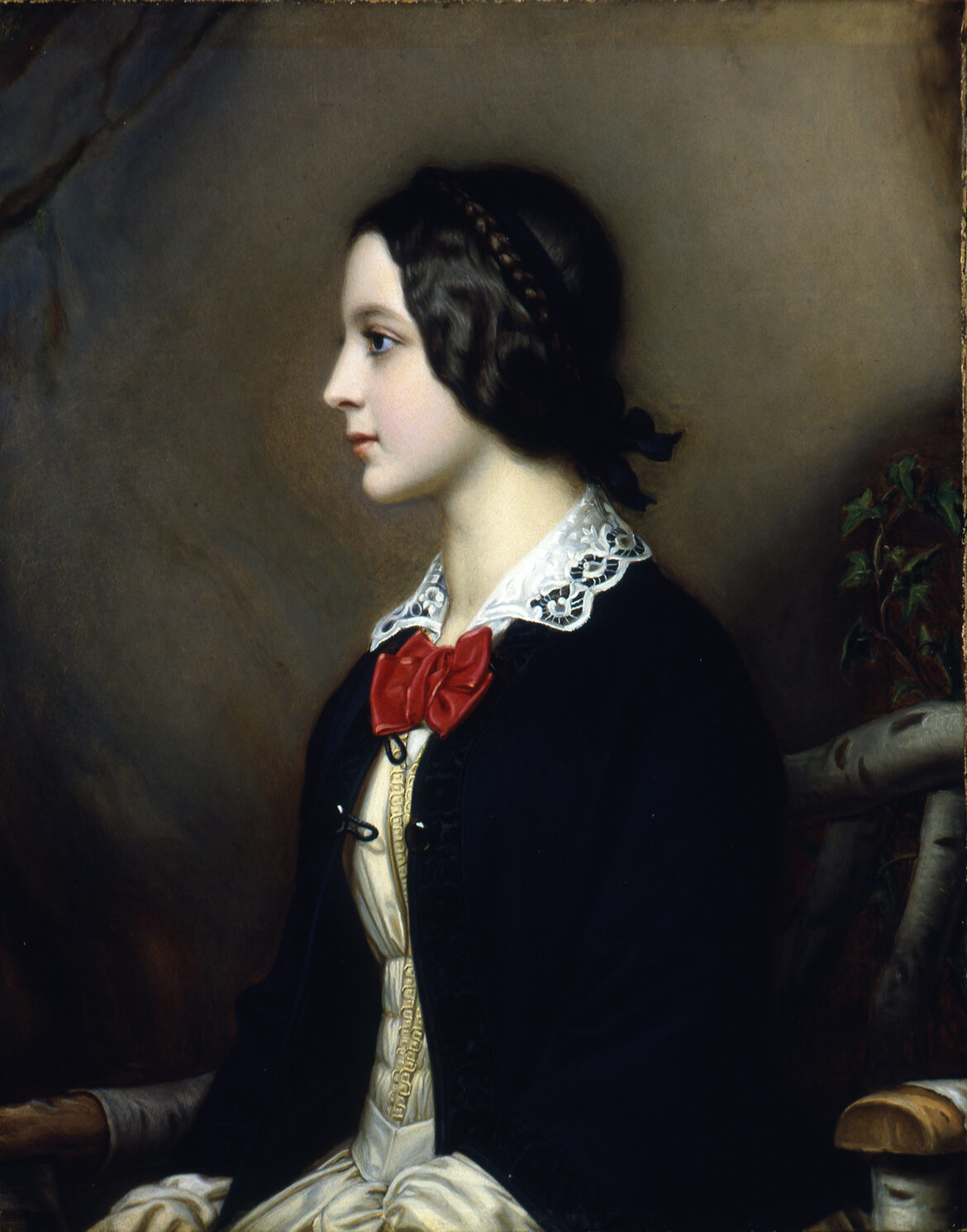
Maria Diestch in a painting for the Gallery of Beauties (first version, 1850)

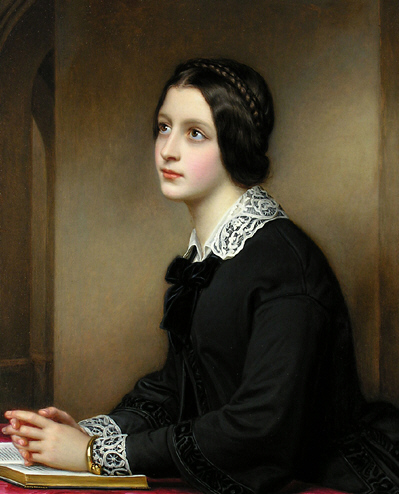
Second version, 1850

Maria Dietsch (1835–1869) was a Mǘnchnerin bourgeoise who appeared in the Gallery of Beauties gathered by Ludwig I of Bavaria in 1850. Her portrait was the last of those portrayed by Joseph Stieler for the Gallery.

== Life ==
Maria was born in Munich in 1835 to Joseph Dietsch, a master tailor from Schwandorf, and Crescentia Dietsch (née Wintergart). Maria became a seamstress. In 1865, she married Georg Sprecher, an editor of the Augsburger Evening Newspaper. She died in 1869.

== Portrait ==
In her second portrait, she wears a black jacket over a chemise or chemisette with a white lace collar adorned with a red bow tie.
