= Anna von Greiner =

19th-century German woman

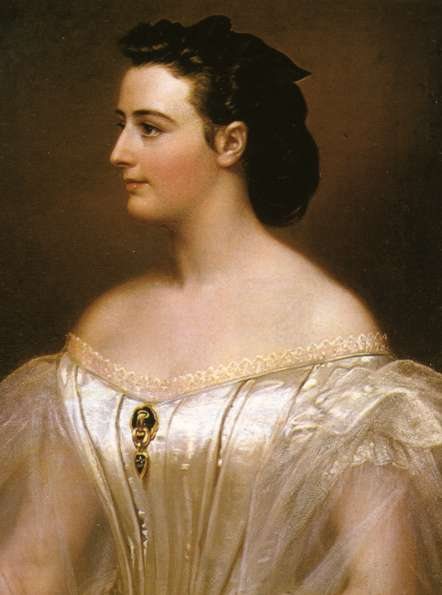
Anna von Greiner in a painting for the Gallery of Beauties, painted by Friedrich Dürck, 1861

Anna von Greiner (née Bartelmann; 1836, Hausen – ?) was a German woman who appeared in the Gallery of Beauties gathered by Ludwig I of Bavaria in 1861, painted by Joseph Stieler's nephew and pupil Friedrich Dürck.

== Life ==
Anna was born in Hausen near Frankfurt in 1836. She was the daughter of the carpenter Christian Jakob Bartelmann and his fiancée Wilhelmine Herrlich.

She worked as an actress in Hamburg and Braunschweig before finding a job at the Court and National Theater in Munich in October 1857. In 1860 she moved on to Vienna. She returned to Munich and married the landowner Emil von Greiner in 1861. The marriage was dissolved in 1865. Anna's year of death is not known.

== Portrait ==
In 1861, King Ludwig I of Bavaria commissioned Stieler's nephew and student Friedrich Dürck (1809–1884) to create two more portraits for the collection. Anna von Greiner's was one of the portraits he painted.

In the portrait, her sleeves made of sheer material that bursts out of tighter inner sleeves are reminiscent of some 1830s and 1840s Russian dresses.
