= Charlotte von Hagn =

German actress

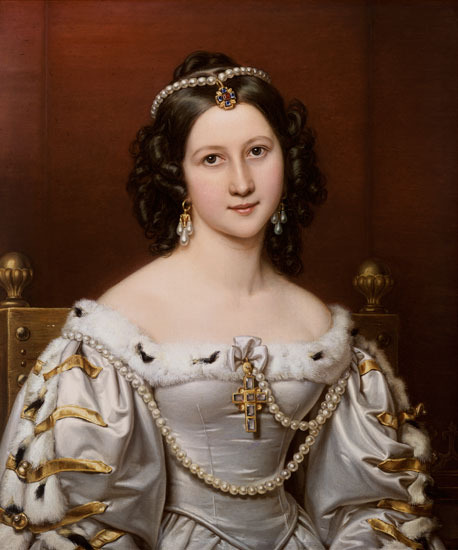
19-year-old Charlotte von Hagn as Thekla in Schiller's Wallenstein – a painting produced for the Gallery of Beauties in 1828

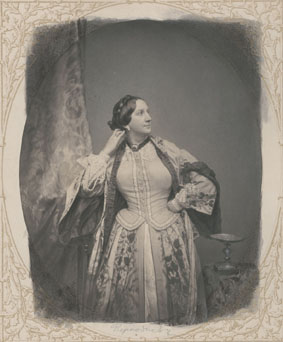
Photograph by Franz Hanfstaengl (date unknown)

Charlotte von Hagn (23 March 1809 – 23 April 1891) was a German actress of the Biedermeier-era.

== Early life ==
Hagn was born in Munich, a daughter of the businessman Karl von Hagn and his wife Josepha Schwab. Her younger brother was the painter Ludwig von Hagn.

== Career ==
At her first appearance at the 1828 Munich Hoftheater, the audience applauded at once and she had huge successes at the Burgtheaters in Vienna, Dresden, Berlin and Budapest.

From 1838 to 1846 she belonged to the Berlin Hofbühne. She worked in Saint Petersburg, Hamburg, Budapest and other cities and seems to have been celebrated everywhere she went. Her talent for comedy was apparently based on her beauty and demeanour. She was described as a witty and charming conversationalist, and she competed with Karoline Bauer; the theatre audiences were divided into "Hagnerians" and "Bauerians". She was much less suited to tragic roles. Her witty impromptu asides gave her the nickname of "the German Déjazet".

== Personal life ==
In the spring of 1848 she married the landowner Alexander von Oven and retired from the stage, but she was divorced in 1851. She had an affair with Franz Liszt, who called her the concubine of two kings, and may have had an affair with Bavarian King Ludwig I. He commissioned a portrait of her from his court painter Joseph Karl Stieler in 1828 for his Gallery of Beauties when she was 19 years old.

== Death ==
After her divorce, Charlotte von Hagn lived for a time in Gotha and then in Munich, where she died in April 1891. She was buried as Charlotte von Oven in the Alter Südfriedhof in Munich. Her grave has been preserved.
