= Wilhelmine Sulzer =

19th-century German court actress

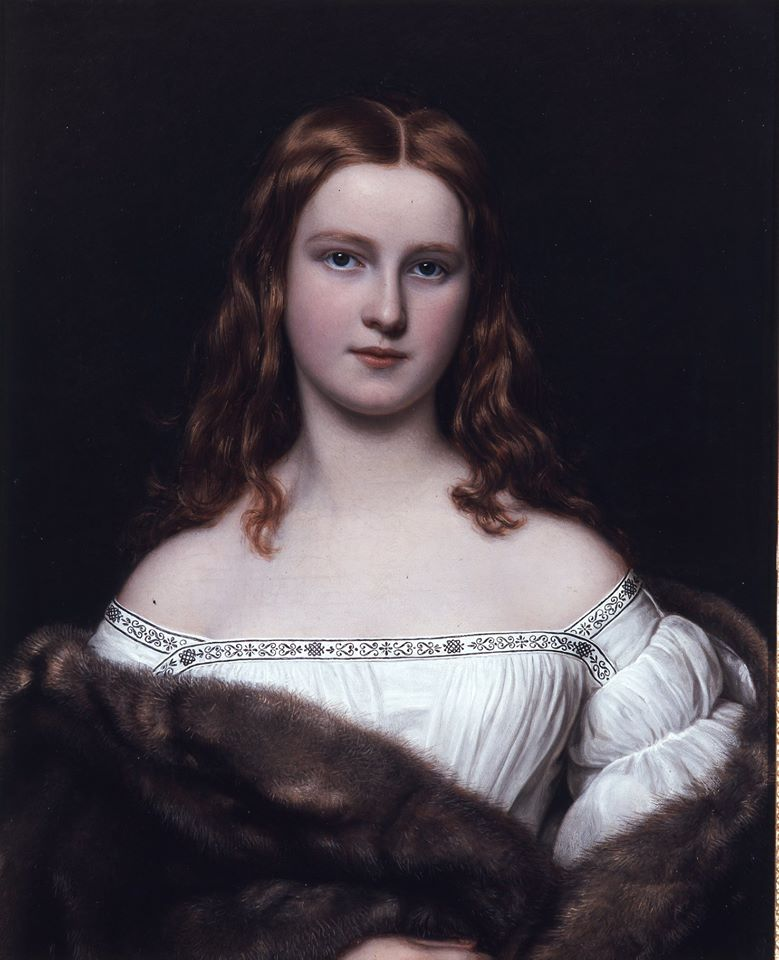
17-year-old Wilhelmine Sulzer in a painting for the Gallery of Beauties painted by Joseph Karl Stieler in 1838

Friederica Catharina Sulzer better known for her stage name as Wilhelmine Sulzer (Munich, 1820 – ?) was a Munich royal court actress. She appeared in the Gallery of Beauties gathered by Ludwig I of Bavaria in 1838.

== Life ==
Friederica was born in Munich in 1820. She was the illegitimate child of the accountant Johannes Sulzer and a worker's daughter named Zoepf. She was orphaned at the age of 16. In 1837 she was employed at the royal court stage. A breast problem forced her to give up acting after just a few months. In 1838 she married the ministerial registrar Karl Schneider. Her date of death is unknown.

== Portrait ==
She was hired as a student of Heigel at the Royal Court Theater in 1837, where she attracted the attention of King Ludwig I of Bavaria who called her a "decent and virtuous girl.". The king then commissioned the court painter Joseph Karl Stieler to paint the 17-year-old actress for his Gallery of Beauties collection in Nymphenburg Palace, Munich.

In her portrait, Wilhelmine Sulze looses her auburn hair, wears a plain white off-shoulder gown, and is wrapped with a luxurious fur.
