= Marianna Florenzi =

19th-century Italian noblewoman

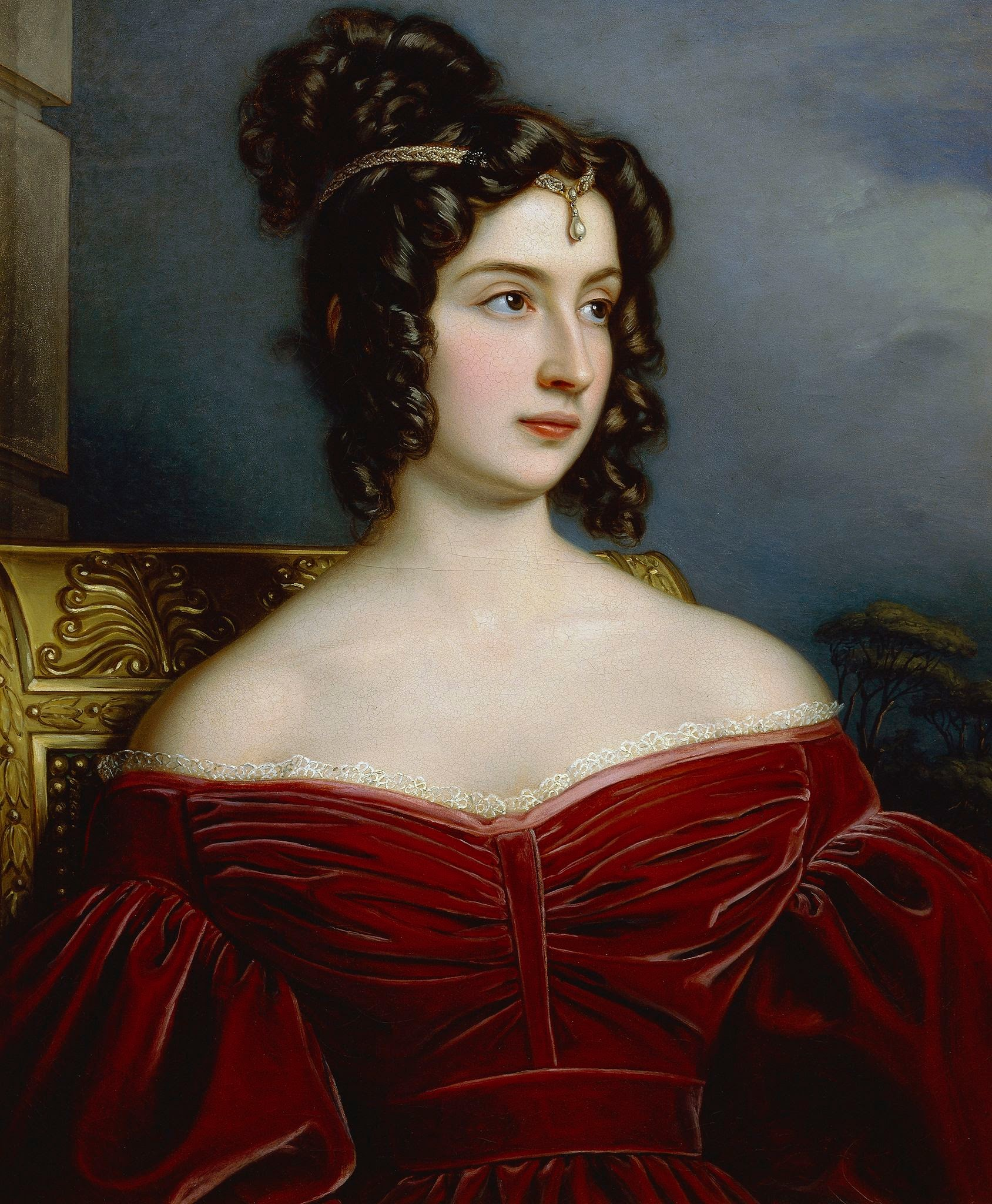
Marchesa Florenzi in a painting from Ludwig I's Gallery of Beauties

Marchioness (in Italian marchesa) Marianna Florenzi (9 November 1802, Ravenna – 15 April 1870, Florence), née Marianna Bacinetti, was an Italian noblewoman, philosopher and translator of philosophical works. She was also known by her married name of Marianna Florenzi Waddington.

== Life ==
A daughter of Count Pietro Alessandro Massimiano Bacinetti of Ravenna and his wife, Countess Laura Rossi di San Secondo, she had a literary education and devoted herself to reading philosophical works, becoming the female ideal of an educated woman of the time and a witty hostess of cultural gatherings and salons. She was one of the first female students, studying natural sciences at the University of Perugia in the first half of the 19th century. She translated Leibniz's Monadology into Italian and also promoted the spread of works by Kant, Spinoza and Schelling in Italian. Politically she supported Italy's national-movement and in 1850 published Some reflections on socialism and communism, which (like many of her other works) ended up on the church's Index Librorum Prohibitorum. She was for forty years a lover and close friend of Ludwig I of Bavaria, whom she visited more than thirty times. He always sought her advice, even in government matters, and 3,000 of her letters to him (along with 1,500 of his replies) survive.

Having returned to Italy, she dedicated herself to the political life of Perugia and after having participated in the uprisings of 1831 she helped several patriots, hosting them at home, in her villa called Colombella. Her house thus became an important meeting center for patriots, but also for writers and scholars.

Because of her liberal politics she was frowned upon by the papal government, which prohibited the publication of her writings. As the years progressed, Bacinetti became increasingly closer to Hegelian philosophy, while remaining in close contact with that supported by Schelling. This new philosophy led her to approach the French philosopher Victor Cousin, with whom she had an exchange of letters between 1862 and 1864, made public only in 1870 by the European Journal.

She died in Florence on 15 April 1870. Only after her death, the Marchesa was re-evaluated in the philosophical field, thanks to Giovanni Gentile, who highlighted the contribution she made to the debate around idealistic philosophy, and her speculative originality.

== King Ludwig I ==
In 1821, 19-year-old Marianna met Crown Prince Ludwig, later King Ludwig I of Bavaria. Their relationship spanned decades. Ludwig visited her many times in Italy, sometimes for weeks. They also met often in Germany. Over a period of 47 years, until Ludwig's death, she wrote over 2,000 letters to him; he in turn wrote her around 3,000 letters. Florenzi's letters are in the Secret House Archives of the Bavarian State Archives in Munich. Ludwig's letters have not survived. Correspondence with other people is partly in the Casa Silvestri, the headquarters of the Soprintendenza Archivistica dell'Umbria in Perugia.

How attached he was to her is also shown by how many portraits he had made of her, such as the well-known portrait by Heinrich Maria von Hess in 1824 (today in the Neue Pinakothek in Munich); a portrait by Rehbenitz in 1827 (or rather 1825); an 1829 bust by Bertel Thorvaldsen (today in the Thorvaldsen Museum in Copenhagen) and in 1828 a portrait by Joseph Karl Stieler (today in the Gallery of Beauties of Nymphenburg Palace in Munich).

Marianna's son Ludovico, whom she gave birth to on October 31, 1821, was officially considered the son of her husband Ettore, but is most likely the son of Ludwig I, his godfather, who had him and his sister educated in Bavaria and was protective of him throughout his life. For Ludwig's sake, Marianna learned German. She also dealt with German literature.

== The Schelling Case ==
Marianna is known for having translated Schelling's Bruno into Italian. The process that led to the publication of the work was subject to numerous unexpected events. Marianna had asked Mamiani, then in Paris, to write the preface, but it was censored by Austria which did not like it. Only after numerous events, in 1844, the translation was published in Milan by the Oggioni publishing house. The translation was appreciated by Schelling, so that an exchange of letters began between the latter and the marquise, which culminated in 1859 with the second edition by Le Monnier. The reprint included some letters exchanged between the two and included a short explanatory manuscript regarding the second stage of his idealistic philosophy.

== Marriages ==
1. 1819, to marchese Ettore Florenzi in Perugia
2. May 7, 1836, to the Englishman Evelyn Waddington in Florence.

== Works ==
- Philosophical Thoughts, Florence, 1840.
- Philosophemes of cosmology and ontology, Perugia, 1863.
- Essays on psychology and logic, Florence, 1864.
- Essay on nature, Florence, 1866.
- Essay on the philosophy of spirit, Florence, 1867.
- Of the immortality of the soul, Florence, 1868.

== Bibliography ==
- (in French) Jean Delisle (ed.): Portraits de traductrices. Ottawa, Les Presses de l’Université d’Ottawa, coll. "Regards sur la traduction" / Arras, Artois Presses Université, coll. "Traductologie", 2002. VIII + 408 Seiten, (franz.)
