= Friederike von Gumppenberg =

19th-century German lady-in-waiting

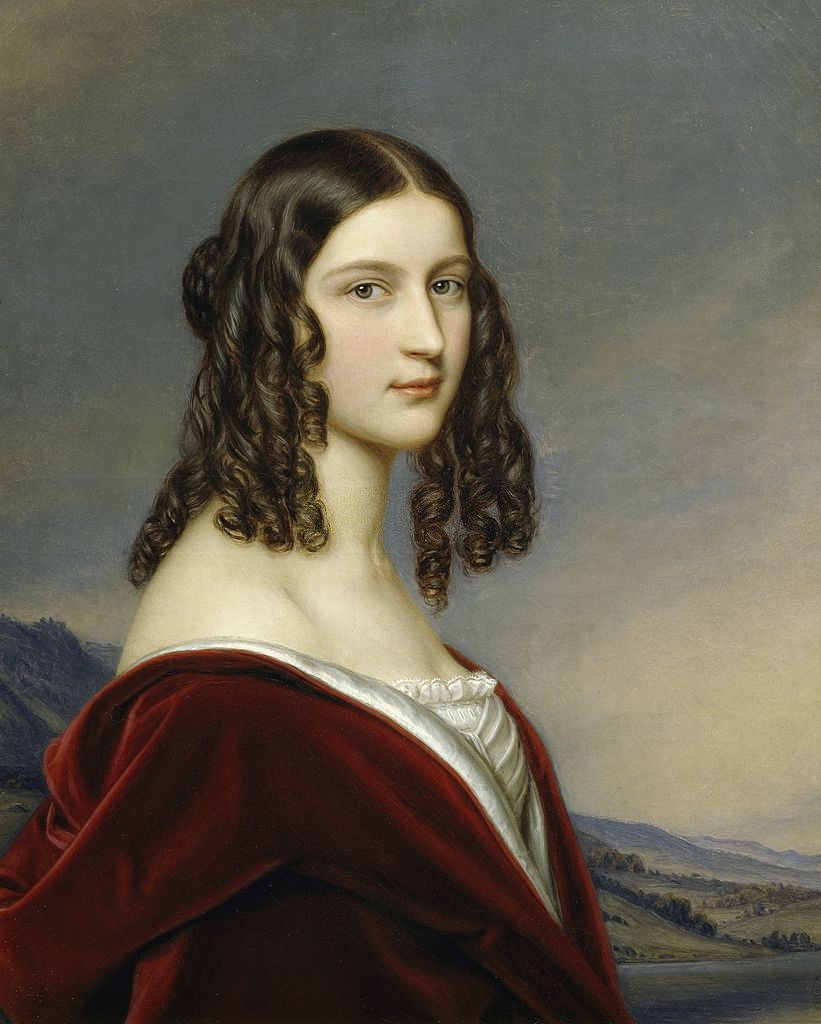
20-year-old Friederike von Gumppenberg in a painting for the Gallery of Beauties, painted by Joseph Karl Stieler in 1843.

Baroness Friederike Viktoria Mariana Ottilie von Gumppenberg (3 August 1823 – 21 January 1916) was a lady-in-waiting for Crown Princess Marie Friederike of Prussia. She appeared in the Gallery of Beauties gathered by King Ludwig I of Bavaria in 1843.

== Early life ==
Friederike was born in Munich in 1823. She was the daughter of the former Oberberg and Salinen councilor Baron Franz Seraph von Gumppenberg and his wife Therese, née Countess von Tannenberg.

== Career ==
In 1842, Friederike entered the service as lady-in-waiting to Crown Princess Marie, who had just married and moved to Bavaria. Friederike remained her lady-in-waiting for 15 years. In 1857 she married her cousin Baron Ludwig von Gumppenberg. Her only son, Maximilian von Gumppenberg on Deining, died in 1889 at age 31. His son, Baron Ottmar Hubert von Gumppenberg, born in Munich in 1888, the grandson of the Friederike, became lord of the castle at Deining in the Upper Palatinate in the 1950s.

She then gave up her service at court. Friederike received the title of Dame of Honor of the Royal Order of Theresia and the Order of Elizabeth. She died in 1916 in Munich.

== Portrait ==
While Friederike was a lady-in-waiting, she often met King Ludwig I of Bavaria, who was particularly interested in beautiful women. At that time, the king's work had been in progress for fifteen years and was much talked about at the Bavarian royal court and in citizen circles. He commissioned his court painter, Joseph Karl Stieler to paint her for the Gallery of Beauties.

He depicted her in a red robe, her face with beautiful eyes and clear gaze surrounded by dark curls and crowned by a simple parting, with a landscape in the background. Her portrait was created the same year as that of her princely mistress, the Crown Princess and later Queen Marie of Bavaria.
