= Isabella of Tauffkirchen-Engelberg =

19th-century Bavarian noblewoman

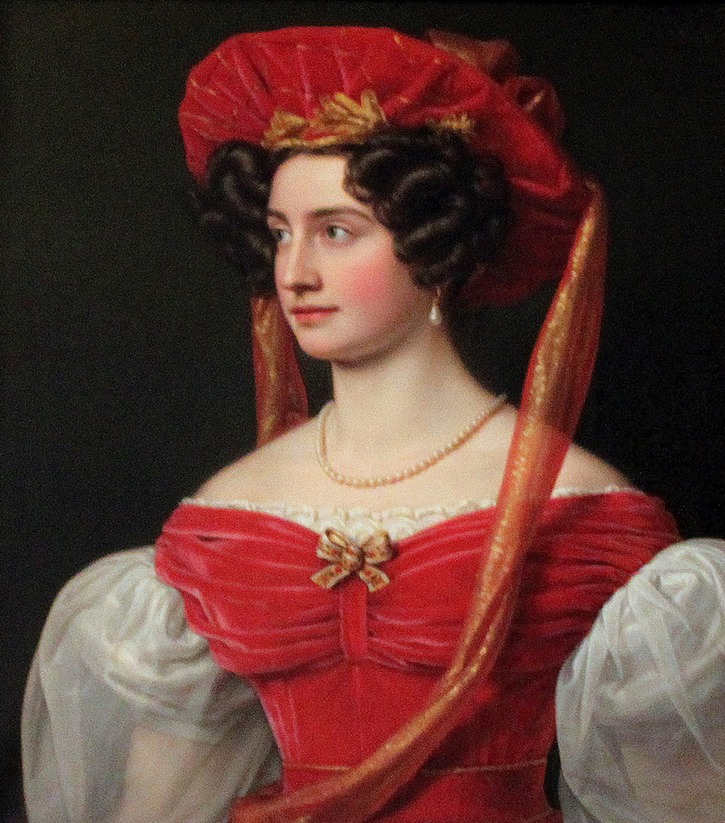
20-year-old Isabella, Countess of Tauffkirchen-Engelberg, in a painting for the Gallery of Beauties, painted by Joseph Karl Stieler in 1829

Maria Isabella Theresa of Tauffkirchen-Engelberg or Isabella, Countess of Tauffkirchen-Engelberg (11 March 1808, Munich – 13 June 1855 Świdnica) was a Bavarian noblewoman of the 19th century. She appeared in the Gallery of Beauties gathered by King Ludwig I of Bavaria in 1828.

== Life ==
Countess Isabella was born in Munich, Kingdom of Bavaria, on 11 March 1808. She was the daughter of Count Maximilian Emanuel Joseph Maria Carl of Tauffkirchen zu Guttenburg und Engelburg (1778–1858), and his wife, Countess Maria Anna von Lodron-Laterano und Castell Romano (1782–1825). Her father attended the military academy and acquired engineering skills there. He held court positions.

On 20 April 1830 she married Count Hektor Julian Roman von Kwilecki auf Kwicz in the Grand Duchy of Posen (Prussia, now Poland). They had two sons together. The marriage ended with the death of her husband on 30 August 1843. Countess Isabella died in 1855 in Świdnica, Poland.

== Portrait ==
In 1828, she was invited by King Ludwig I of Bavaria to model for Joseph Stieler so that aristocrats might also be included in the collection and raise its value in the eyes of the public, by portraying women of all social classes. Her portrait was one of the original ten models for the Gallery of Beauties

She wears an Italian red velvet renaissance robe with puffy white, semi-transparent puffed sleeves and a red gathered hat with gold ribbons to emphasize her Italian background.
