= Gallery of Beauties =

19th-century German portrait collection

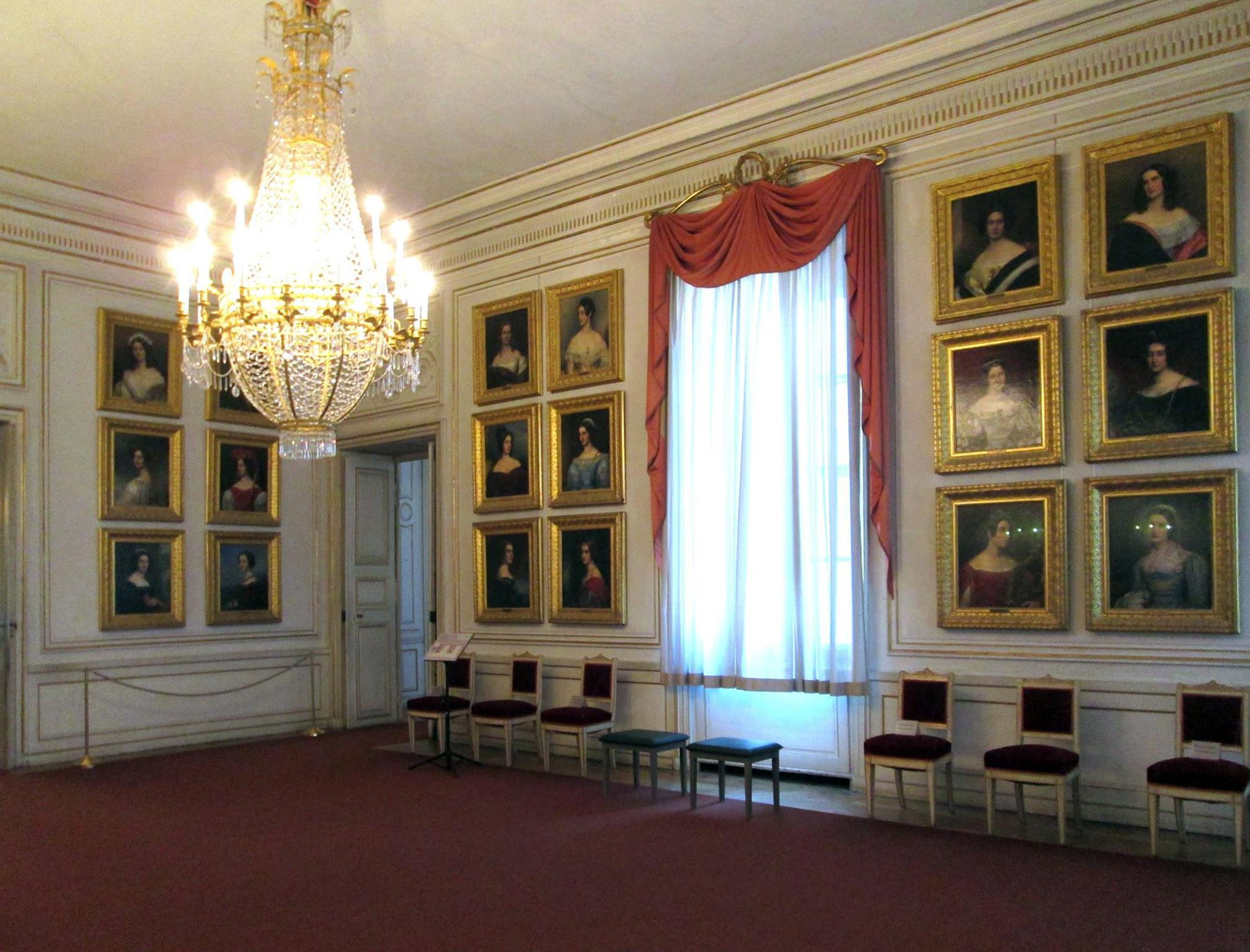
Gallery of Beauties

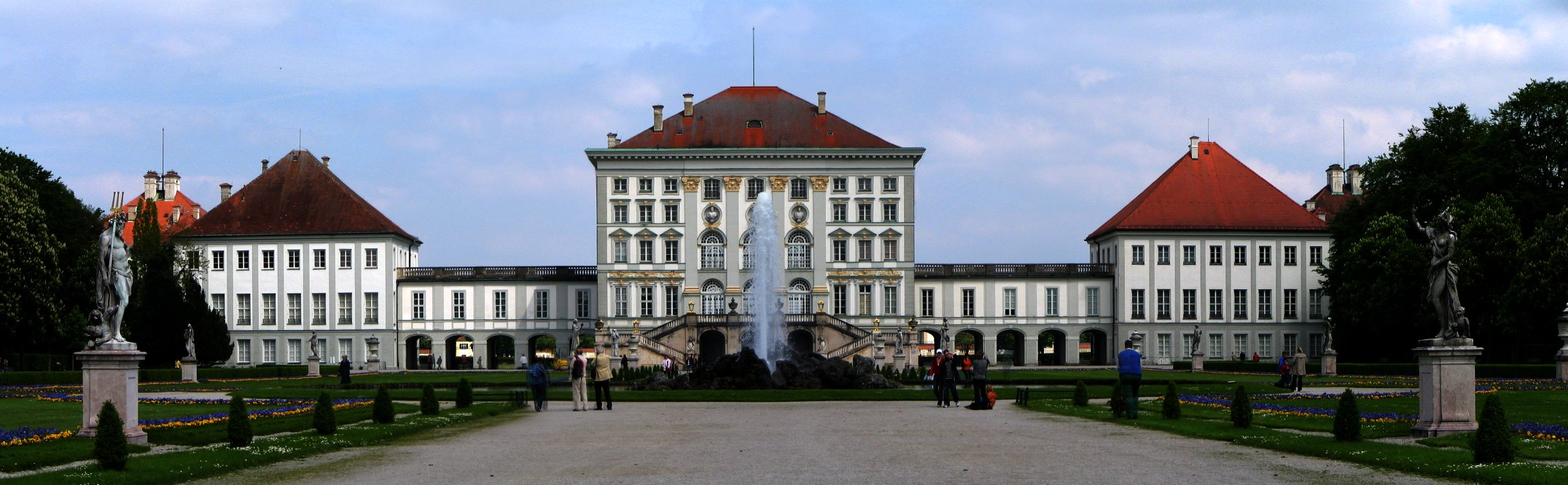
The Nymphenburg Palace seen from its park

The Gallery of Beauties (German: Schönheitengalerie) is a collection of 38 portraits of the most beautiful women from the nobility and bourgeoisie of Munich, Germany, gathered by King Ludwig I of Bavaria in the south pavilion of his Nymphenburg Palace. All but two were painted between 1827 and 1850 by Joseph Karl Stieler (appointed court painter in 1820), the others by Friedrich Dürck, a student of his.

Some of the collection's best-known works are the portraits Helene Sedlmayr, a shoemaker's daughter, actress Charlotte von Hagn, Italian noblewoman Marianna Florenzi, and Eliza Gilbert, the King's Irish mistress (better known as Lola Montez). It also includes paintings of a Briton, a Greek, a Scot, and a Jew, as well as relations of Ludwig's including the wife and daughter of Ludwig of Oettingen-Wallerstein, and the king's own daughter, Princess Alexandra of Bavaria.

All 38 models were rewarded by Ludwig I. He took over their dowry, paid them an allowance or found them a job at court. He remained in active correspondence with some of them for years, while others only briefly crossed his life.

== Previous collections ==
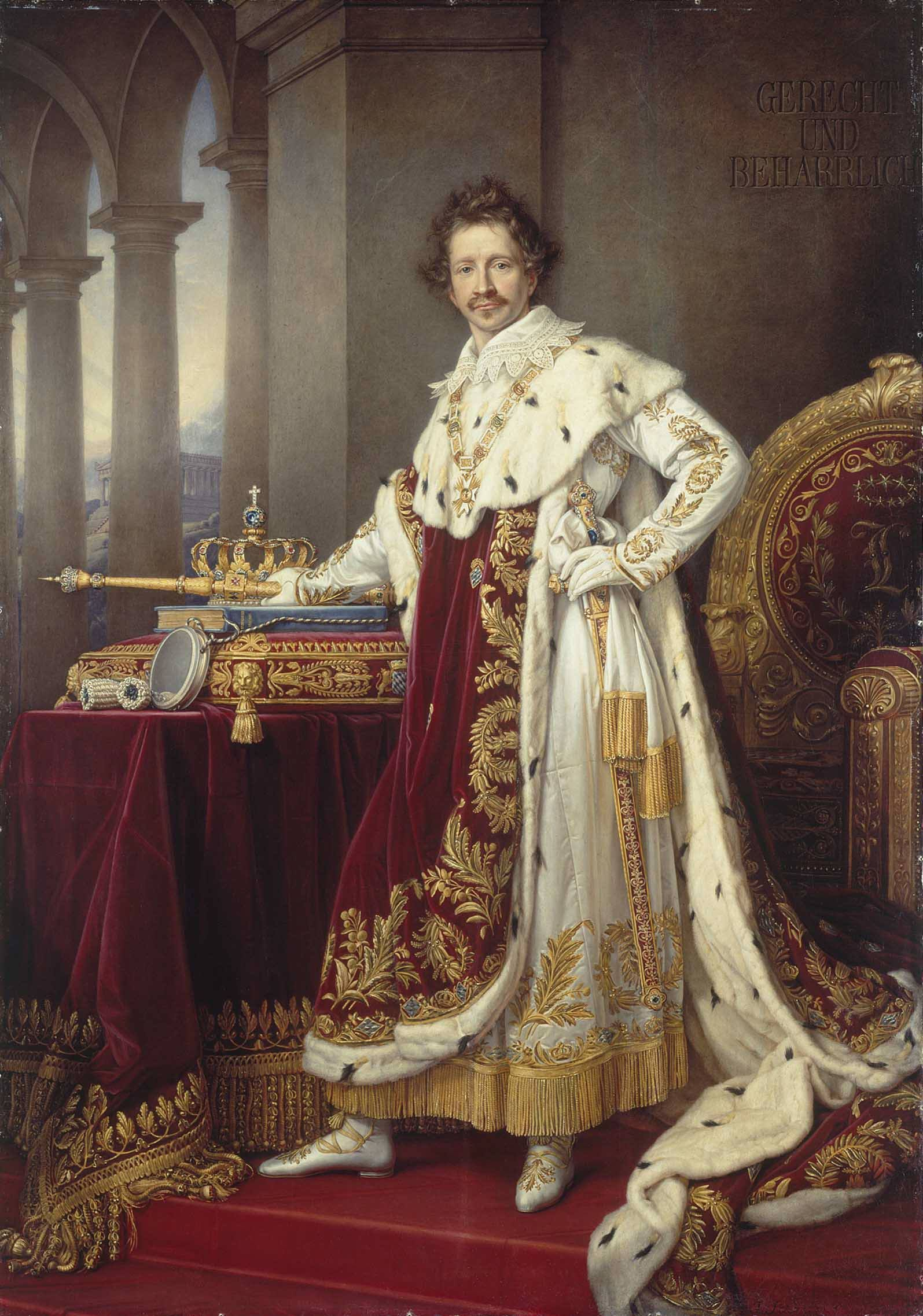
Portrait of Ludwig I of Bavaria by Joseph Karl Stieler, 1826

The idea of collecting paintings of beautiful women in a gallery was not an invention of Ludwig I, but seems to have originated in Italy. According to the earliest records, one of the dukes of Mantua is said to have owned such a collection in the 17th century. Something similar was reported at the courts of Ferdinand II, Archduke of Austria in Ruhelust Castle, and Lorenzo Onofrio Colonna, 8th Prince of Paliano in Carnesino Castle.

In the United Kingdom there are the Windsor Beauties, eleven of the ladies of King Charles II's court painted by Sir Peter Lely in the 1660s, and the Hampton Court Beauties, a later set by Sir Godfrey Kneller of the most beautiful noblewomen at the court of King William III and Queen Mary II.

The gallery of originally 40 works that was created between 1650 and 1675 for Henriette Adelaide of Savoy, Electress of Bavaria had a much greater influence on Ludwig I. The collection probably first hung in the old Schleissheim Castle and can now be found at least in part in the vestibule of the Cuvilliés Theater in Munich. The motifs are allegories of Henriette's alleged ladies-in-waiting.

Not only Ludwig I, but also Henriette's son Elector Maximilian II Emanuel, was inspired by these works. In his gallery of beauties there were the most beautiful ladies of the French court from the time of King Louis XIV.

Elector Augustus II of Saxony had several galleries of beauties in Pillnitz Castle: one with ladies-in-waiting of Queen Mary II of England, created by students of Anthony van Dyck, one by Pietro Rotari (1707–1762), whom he invited to Dresden in 1750, and possibly another one with beautiful Polish women.

William VIII, Landgrave of Hesse-Kassel had Johann Heinrich Tischbein paint 28 beauties: 14 bourgeois ones for the first anteroom of Wilhelmsthal Palace, 14 noble ones for the second. The models were known to William VIII; they were not portraits (or even copies of existing works) of ladies from other courts unknown to him, as had been common in previous galleries.

Probably the largest gallery of beauties comes from Pietro Rotari. Empress Elizabeth of Russia commissioned the artist from Verona, who had been her court painter since 1756, to create a cabinet of fashions and graces. He was supposed to paint young women who represented the diversity of Russian people. As part of this commission, Rotari not only created 360 paintings of middle-class Russian women for the Empress, but also an additional 50, which she gave away to the Russian Academy of Art. The Empress' collection was intended for Peterhof Palace. Today around 40 of the works can be found in Arkhangelskoye Palace.

== Origin ==
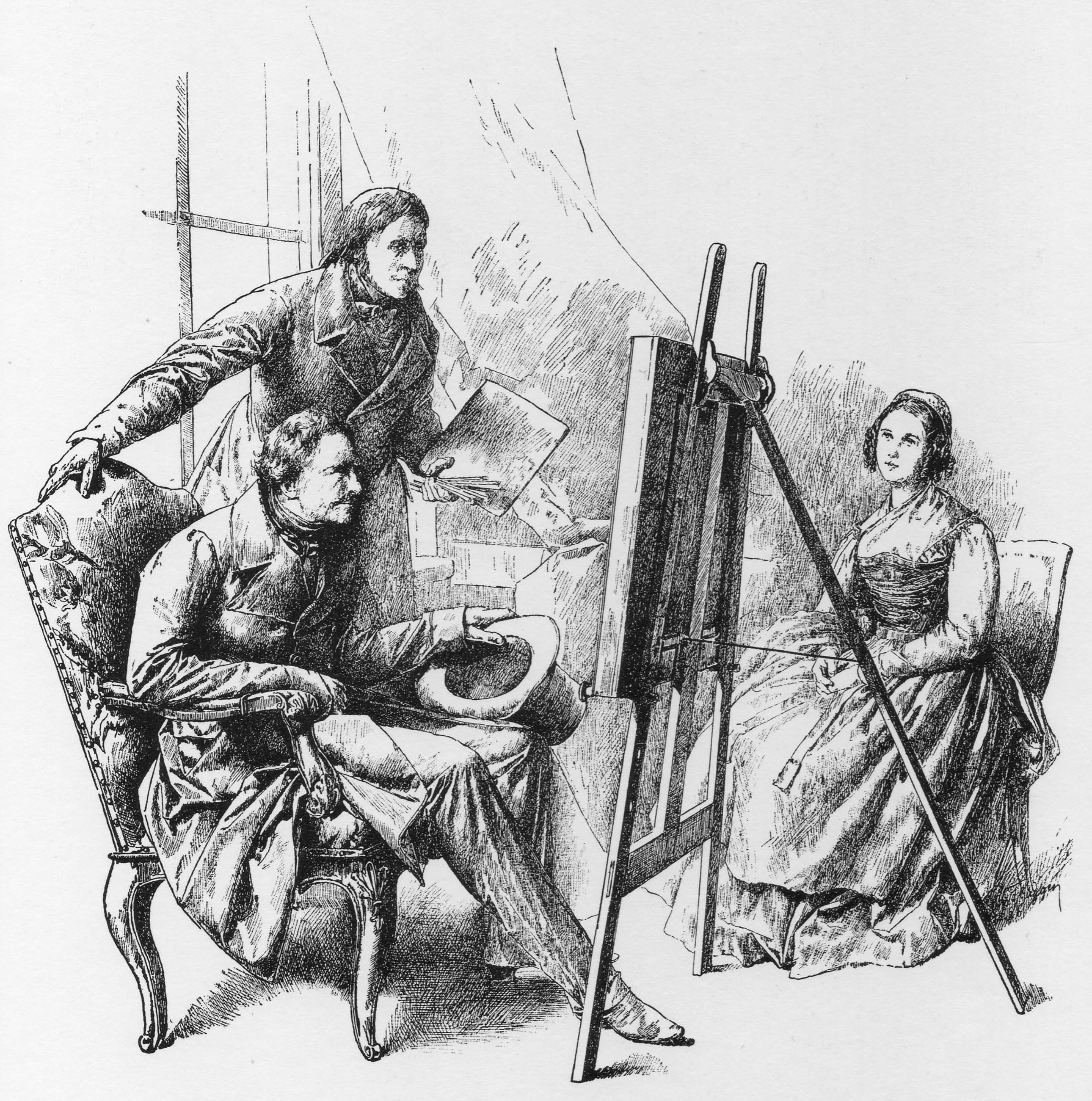
Drawing by Joseph Flüggen, showing Ludwig I and Stieler during a meeting with Helene Sedlmayr

Before the Gallery of Beauties was created, there was a small scandal around 1817 because of two works by Joseph Karl Stieler. He had painted a portrait of Countess Rambaldi, one of the mistresses of Ludwig I (while still crown prince), which allegorically depicted the Countess as a Madonna in order to anonymize her. This portrait was hung next to that of Ludwig I, and the public recognized the motif and was outraged. Ludwig I's portrait, which Nathanael von Schlichtegroll described as a "masterpiece" in a letter to Georg Issel, was then removed.

The excitement over this painting was probably one of the reasons why Ludwig I decided to create a more anonymous gallery, which was first mentioned in 1821. At this point, Stieler, still a court painter without a fixed salary, offered portraits of Madame Lang and an Italian opera singer, Adelaide Schiasetti. Both works were kept out of the gallery. According to the King's will, the gallery was to be primarily a collection of patriotic beauties, although foreign women were also represented, and posterity should be able to recognize how the character of female beauty was expressed at that time.

When Ludwig I began his expansion of the Munich Residenz in 1826, he planned the rooms in which the collection would hang. The plan for the rooms called for red and green stucco marble in wide, horizontal layering for the walls, which were to be finished with a base zone of around 80 cm. The coffered ceiling and door panels were decorated with tendril ornaments. In 1828, in a letter to Johann Georg von Dillis, he named the first ten works that were to be exhibited in the rooms under construction:

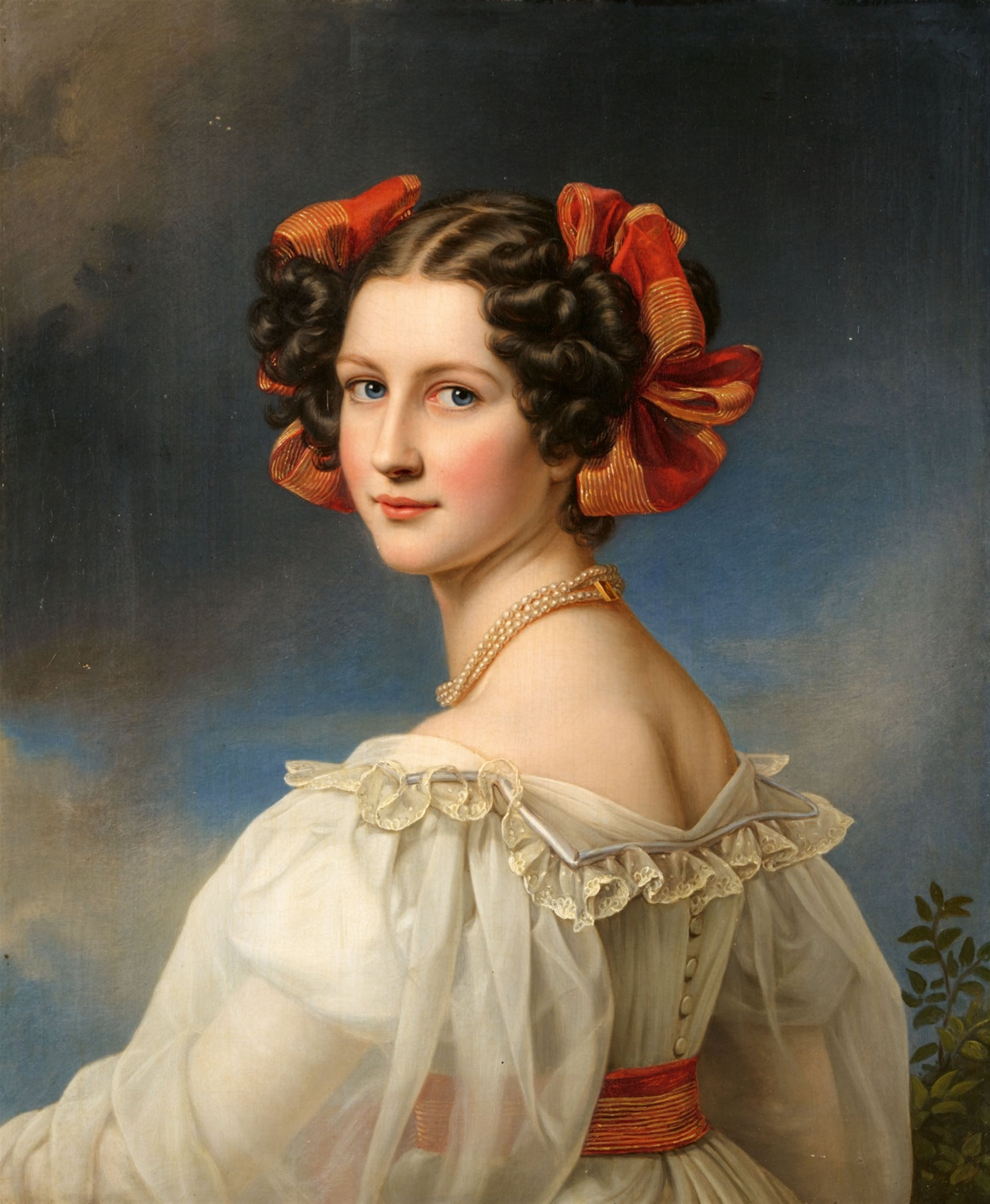
Auguste Strobl, second version, painted in January 1827

- Marianna Florenzi
- Isabella von Tauffkirchen-Engelberg
- Charlotte von Hagn
- Auguste Strobl (2)
- Antonietta Cornelia Vetterlein
- Maximiliane Borzaga
- Nanette Kaulla
- Regina Daxenberger
- Anna Hillmayer

These ten portraits were also presented to the public in 1829 as part of an art exhibition together with Stieler's portrait of Goethe. Nanette Kaulla's portrait was unfinished at this point. Others were added, so that when they were moved to the finished rooms in 1835, 17 portraits created over the last eight years or so could be exhibited:

- Amalie von Krüdener
- Jane Law, Baroness Ellenborough
- Amalia von Schintling
- Helene Sedlmayr
- Crescentia, Princess of Oettingen-Wallerstein
- Irene von Arco-Stepperg
- Caroline von Holnstein

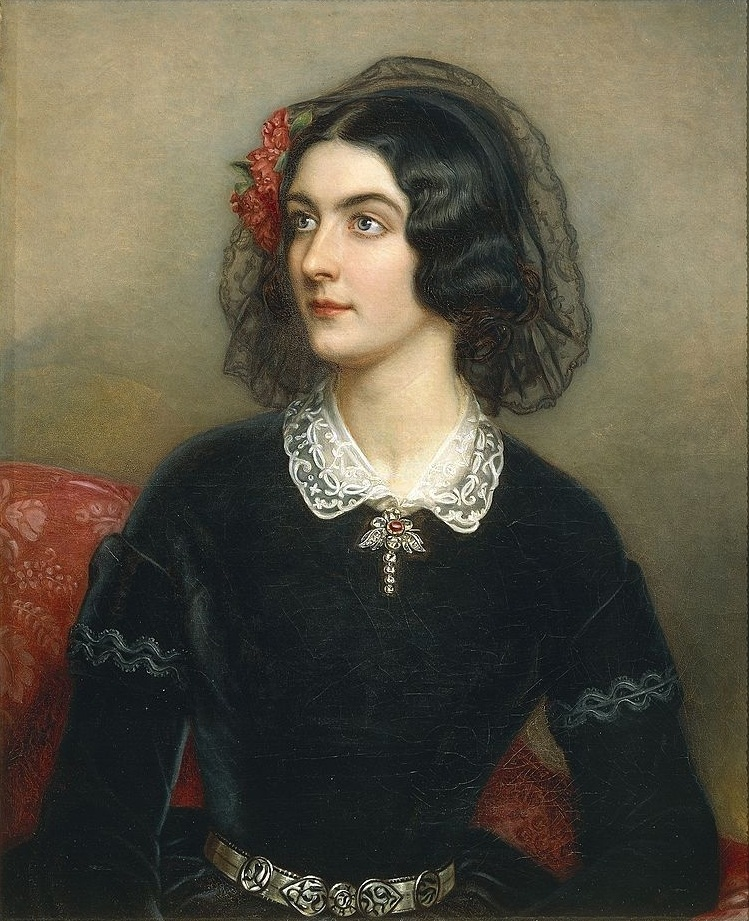
Portrait of Lola Montez, 1847. Lola Montez, mistress of Ludwig I and ultimately the reason for his abdication, was the penultimate subject for Stieler's gallery of beauties

Over the next 15 years, Stieler completed 19 other paintings and finished his work with the portraits of Lola Montez and Maria Dietsch. Cosmetic corrections were made to the latter because in Stieler's opinion, Dietsch was "not an excellent beauty".

The painter also had difficulties with his penultimate work for the gallery, the portrait of Lola Montez: he feared the reaction of the public, which did not have much use for Montez. Ludwig I had to ask him to paint her several times in 1846. He ended up painting her in the costume of a Spanish dancer, with a relatively bare upper body and a mask in her hand. Ludwig I was outraged by the motif and had it painted again in black velvet. The King was also not enthusiastic about the result of Stieler's work, whose motivation was rather low: "Your brush is getting old", criticized Ludwig I. Stieler replied to the King: "But nice enough for an old brush."

When Marianna Florenzi, from whom Ludwig I repeatedly sought advice, including on state matters, was told that the portrait of Lola Montez was now hanging next to hers, she categorically demanded that her portrait be taken down, and threatened to withdraw her favor otherwise.

In 1861, Ludwig I commissioned Stieler's nephew and student Friedrich Dürck (1809–1884) to create two more portraits for the collection. This is how the only two paintings in the collection that did not come directly from Stieler were created: Anna von Greiner and Carlotta Boos zu Waldeck.

Since the ballroom building was destroyed during World War II, the collection moved to the small dining room at Nymphenburg Palace. The original plan was to have them resume their place soon.

== List ==
| Name | Life | Husband(s) | Dimensions | Year | Image |
|---|---|---|---|---|---|
| Auguste Strobl | (1807–1871) | Anton Hilber (⚭ 1831) | 72.5 × 59.2 cm | 1827 | |
| Maximiliane Borzaga | (1806–1837) | Joseph Krämer (⚭ 1830) | 72 × 58 cm | 1827 | |
| Isabella von Tauffkirchen-Engelberg | (1808–1855) | Count Hektor von Kwilecky auf Kwilcz (⚭ 1830) | 72 × 59.8 cm | 1828 | |
| Amalie von Krüdener | (1808–1888) | Baron Alexander von Krüdener (⚭ 1825–1852); Count Nikolay Vladimirovich Adlerberg (⚭ 1855) | 72.2 × 59 cm | 1828 | |
| Antonietta Cornelia Vetterlein | (1811–1862) | Baron Franz Ludwig von Künsberg auf Hain-Schmeilsdorf (⚭ 1843) | 72.5 × 59.2 cm | 1828 | |
| Charlotte von Hagn | (1809–1891) | Alexander von Oven (⚭ 1848–1851) | 73.2 × 59.5 cm | 1828 | |
| Nanette Kaulla | (1812–1876) | Salomon Joseph Heine (⚭ 1834) | 72.2 × 59 cm | 1829 | |
| Anna Hillmayer | (1812–1847) | Died unmarried on her 35th birthday | 71.7 × 58.4 cm | 1829 | |
| Regina Daxenberger | (1811–1872) | Heinrich Fahrenbacher (⚭ 1832) | 70 × 58.9 cm | 1829 | |
| Jane Law, Baroness Ellenborough | (1807–1881) | Edward Law, 2nd Baron Ellenborough (⚭ 1824–1830); Baron Karl von Veningen-Ulner (⚭ 1834–1842); Count Spyridon Theotoky (⚭ 1841–1846); Sheikh Medjuel el Mezrab (⚭ 1854) | 72 × 58 cm | 1831 | |
| Marianna Florenzi | (1802–1870) | Marquis Ettore Florenzi (⚭ 1819–1832); Evelyn Waddington (⚭ 1836) | 71.6 × 58.4 cm | 1831 | |
| Amalia von Schintling | (1812–1831) | Remained unmarried. Engaged to her cousin Fritz von Schintling, but died of consumption before the wedding. | 72 × 58.5 cm | 1831 | |
| Helene Sedlmayr | (1813–1898) | Hermes Miller (⚭ 1834) | 71.4 × 58.2 cm | 1831 | |
| Irene von Arco-Stepperg | (1811–1877) | Count Aloys von Arco- Stepperg (⚭ 1830) | 72 × 58.2 cm | 1834 | |
| Caroline von Holnstein | (1815–1859) | Count Carl Theodor von Holnstein aus Bayern (⚭ 1831–1857); Baron Wilhelm von Künsberg (⚭ 1857) | 71.5 × 58 cm | 1834 | |
| Crescentia, Princess of Oettingen-Wallerstein | (1806–1853) | Louis, Prince of Oettingen-Wallerstein (⚭ 1823) | 72 × 58 cm | 1836 | |
| Jane Erskine | (1818–1846) | James Henry Callander (⚭ 1837) | 72 × 57.9 cm | 1837 | |
| Theresa Spence | (1815 – ?) | William Blundell Spence (1814–1900, ⚭ July 23, 1835) | 72 × 57.8 cm | 1837 | |
| Mathilde von Jordan | (1817–1856) | Count Friedrich Ferdinand von Beust (⚭ 1843) | 72 × 59 cm | 1837 | |
| Wilhelmine Sulzer | (1820 – ?) | Karl Schneider (⚭ 1838) | 72 × 59 cm | 1838 | |
| Luise von Neubeck | (1816–1872) | Remained unmarried. Became canoness of the Holy Spirit Hospital in Munich in the last two years of her life. | Missing since 1936 | 1839 | |
| Antonia Wallinger | (1823–1893) | Friedrich von Ott (⚭ 1860) | 72.3 × 58.8 cm | 1840 | |
| Rosalie Julie von Bonar | (1814 – ?) | Baron Ernst von Bonar (⚭ 1834) | 72 × 58.2 cm | 1840 | |
| Sophie of Bavaria | (1805–1872) | Archduke Franz Karl of Austria (⚭ 1824) | 72 × 59 cm | 1841 | |
| Katerina Botsari | (1820–1872) | Prince Georgios Caradja (⚭ 1845) | 72.4 × 59 cm | 1841 | |
| Caroline Lizius | (1825–1908) | Karl Albert von Stobäus (⚭ 1849) | 71 × 59.4 cm | 1842 | |
| Elise List | (1822–1893) | Gustav Pacher von Theinburg (⚭ 1845) | 70.3 × 59.2 cm | 1842 | |
| Marie of Prussia | (1825–1889) | Maximilian II, King of Bavaria (⚭ 1842) | 71.7 × 58 cm | 1843 | |
| Friederike von Gumppenberg | (1823–1916) | Baron Ludwig von Gumppenberg (⚭ 1857) | 70 × 59.4 cm | 1843 | |
| Caroline von Oettingen-Wallerstein | (1824–1889) | Count Hugo Waldbott von Bassenheim (⚭ 1843) | 71 × 59.5 cm | 1843 | |
| Emily, Lady Milbanke | (1822–1910) | Sir John Milbanke, 8th Baronet (⚭ 1843) | 71 × 59 cm | 1844 | |
| Josepha Conti | (1823–1881) | Anton Conti (⚭ 1840); Anton Schirsner (⚭ 1856) | 71.5 × 58.5 cm | 1844 | |
| Princess Alexandra of Bavaria | (1826–1875) | Remained unmarried. Became an abbess of the Royal Chapter for Ladies of Saint Anne in Munich and Würzburg | 70.5 × 59.2 cm | 1845 | |
| Auguste Ferdinande of Austria | (1825–1864) | Prince Luitpold of Bavaria (⚭ 1844) | 70.2 × 59 cm | 1845 | |
| Lola Montez | (1821–1861) | Thomas James (⚭ 1837–1842); George Trafford Heald (⚭ 1849–1850); Patrick Hull (⚭ 1853–1853) | 72 × 58.6 cm | 1847 | |
| Maria Dietsch | (1835–1869) | Georg Sprecher (⚭ 1865) | 73 × 59 cm | 1850 | |
| Anna von Greiner | (1836 – ?) | Emil von Greiner (⚭ 1861–1865) | | 1861 | |
| Carlotta Boos zu Waldeck | (1838–1920) | Count Philipp Boos zu Waldeck (⚭ 1863) | | 1863 | |

== Reception ==
In the 1840s, Heinrich Heine wrote the following lines in his praises of Ludwig I and his Gallery of Beauties:

He loves art

and the most beautiful women,
he has them portrayed;
He walks in this painted seraglio

as an art eunuch.

Moritz Gottlieb Saphir published the poem "The Two Roses" in February 1828, which deals with the portrait of Amalie von Krüdener.
