= Amalia von Schintling =

19th-century Bavarian beauty

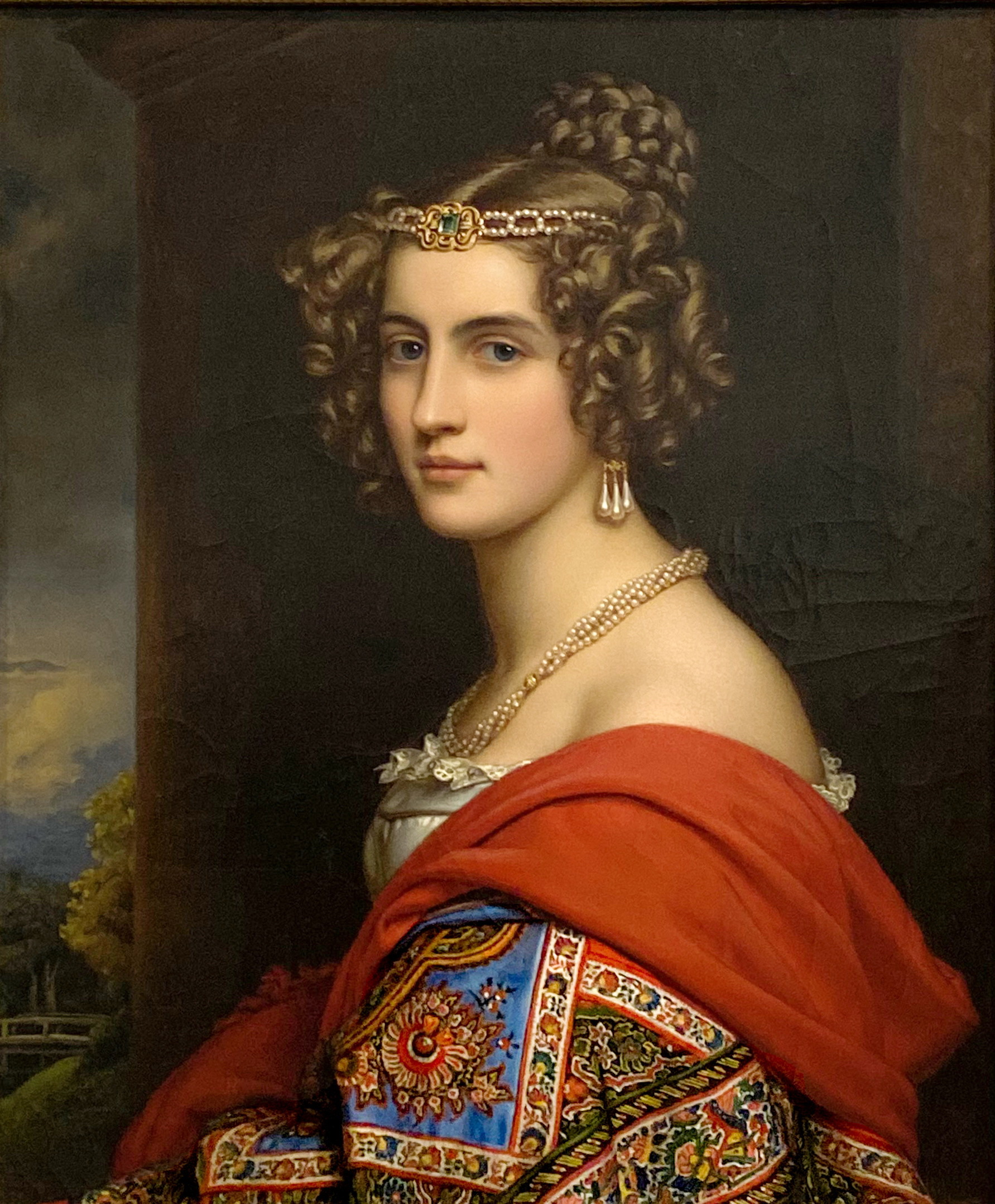
Amalie von Schintling in a painting for the Gallery of Beauties in 1826.

Amalie von Schintling (9 August 1812, Munich–- 22 December 1831, Munich) was a Bavarian beauty of the 19th century. She gained notoriety through her portrait in the Gallery of Beauties in Nymphenburg Palace.

== Life ==
Amalia von Schintling (whose first name is also given as Amalie in some sources) was the daughter of Major Lorenz von Schintling, a member of the Quartermaster General's Staff, and his wife Theresia, Baroness von Hacke. The portrayal of Amalia von Schintling in the Gallery of Beauties was approved by her father, but was against the wishes of her fiancée Fritz von Schintling. Schintling, who was Amalia's cousin, would have resisted having his future bride painted for the gallery out of a "very exaggerated sense of honor".

Before the planned wedding to Fritz von Schintling and only a short time after the portrait was created in the Gallery, Amalie fell ill with tuberculosis and succumbed to the disease on 22 December 1831, at the age of just 19, in her hometown of Munich.

== Portrait ==
The portrait of Amalia von Schintling, painted in oil by Joseph Karl Stieler, he was King Ludwig I of Bavaria's court painter and was created in 1831 and measures 72 × 58.5 cm. She wears an oriental style cape, a jewelled diadem in her hair, a string of pearls around her neck and Greco-Roman style shades to match her cape that was especially chosen for the occasion of the portrait. It is the twelfth of a total of 38 portrait paintings that were commissioned for the Gallery of Beauties in Nymphenburg Palace.
