= Nanette Kaulla =

19th-century woman

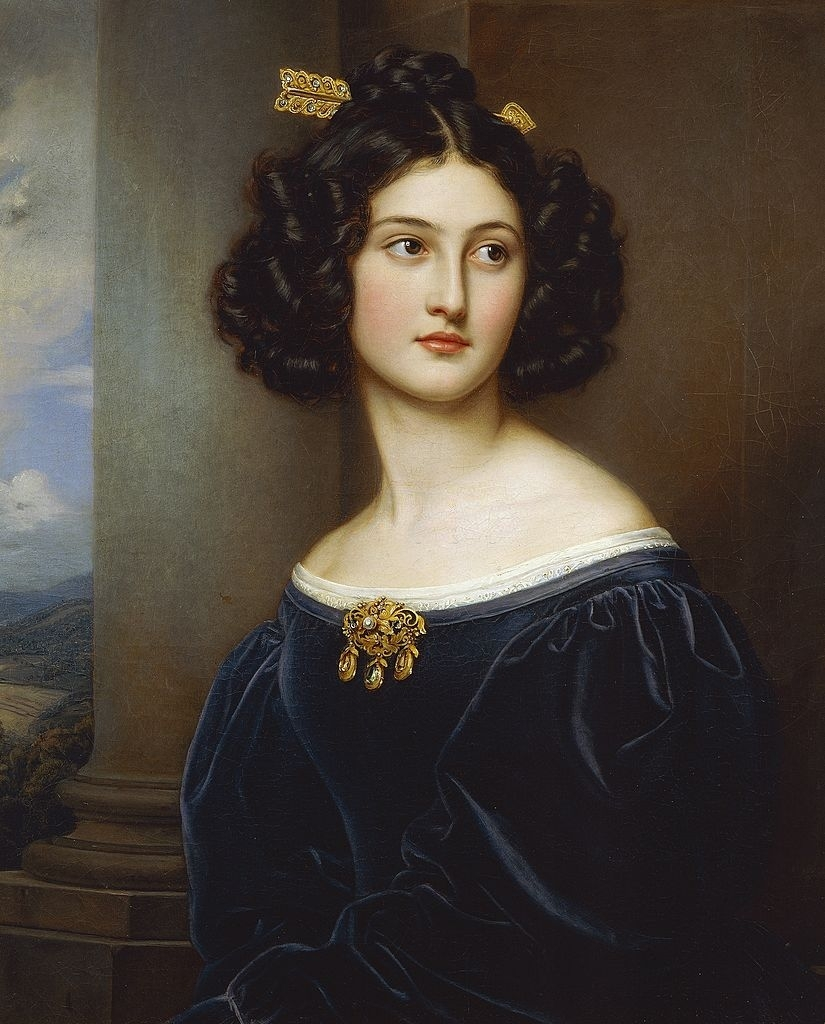
17-year-old Nanette Kaulla in a painting for the Gallery of Beauties, painted by Joseph Karl Stieler in 1829

Nanette Kaulla (1812, Munich – 1872) was a Munich beauty of the 19th century. She appeared in the Gallery of Beauties gathered by King Ludwig I of Bavaria in 1829. She was also called the "most beautiful Jew in Munich". She was described as pretty, witty and kind.

== Life ==
Nanette Kaulla was born in Munich in 1812, the thirteenth and youngest daughter to Joseph Raphael Kaulla and Josephine Bernhardine Peppenheimer. Her father was the court agent and chairman of the Jewish community in Munich. In 1834 she married the Munich merchant Salomon Joseph Heine (1803–1863) whose nephew was the poet Heinrich Heine who was a 3rd cousin to Karl Marx. She died in November 1872 without children.

== Portrait ==
Her portrait was begun in 1829 by Joseph Karl Stieler when she was 17 years old. It was the last of the first ten portraits that the artist painted for King Ludwig I of Bavaria. She wears a black dress with big sleeves and golden brooch in the center and an arrow as a hairpin.
