= Helene Sedlmayr =

German beauty

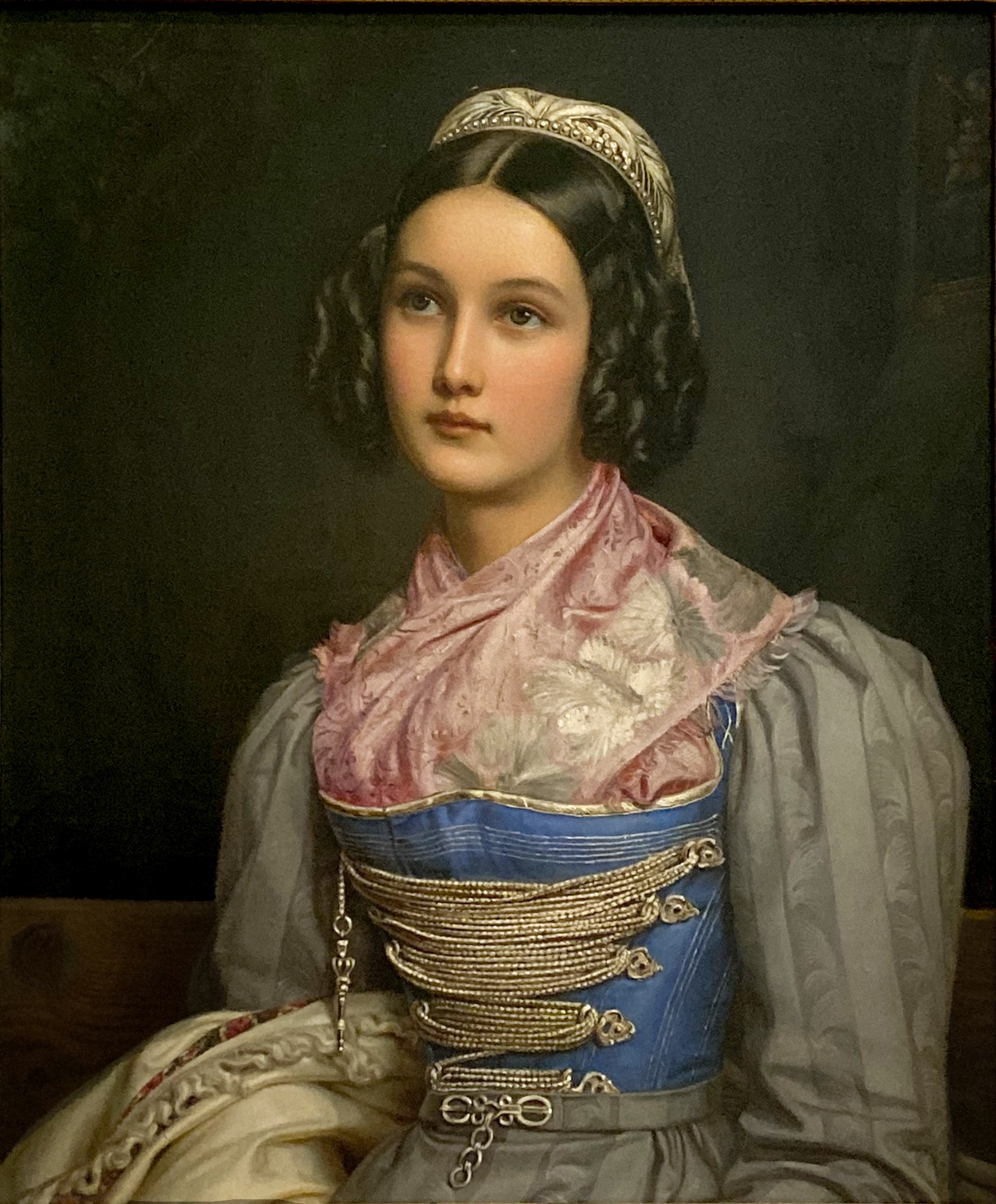
Portrait of 17-year-old Helene Sedlmayr in Old Munich costume and cap by court painter Joseph Karl Stieler, c. 1830, for the Gallery of Beauties

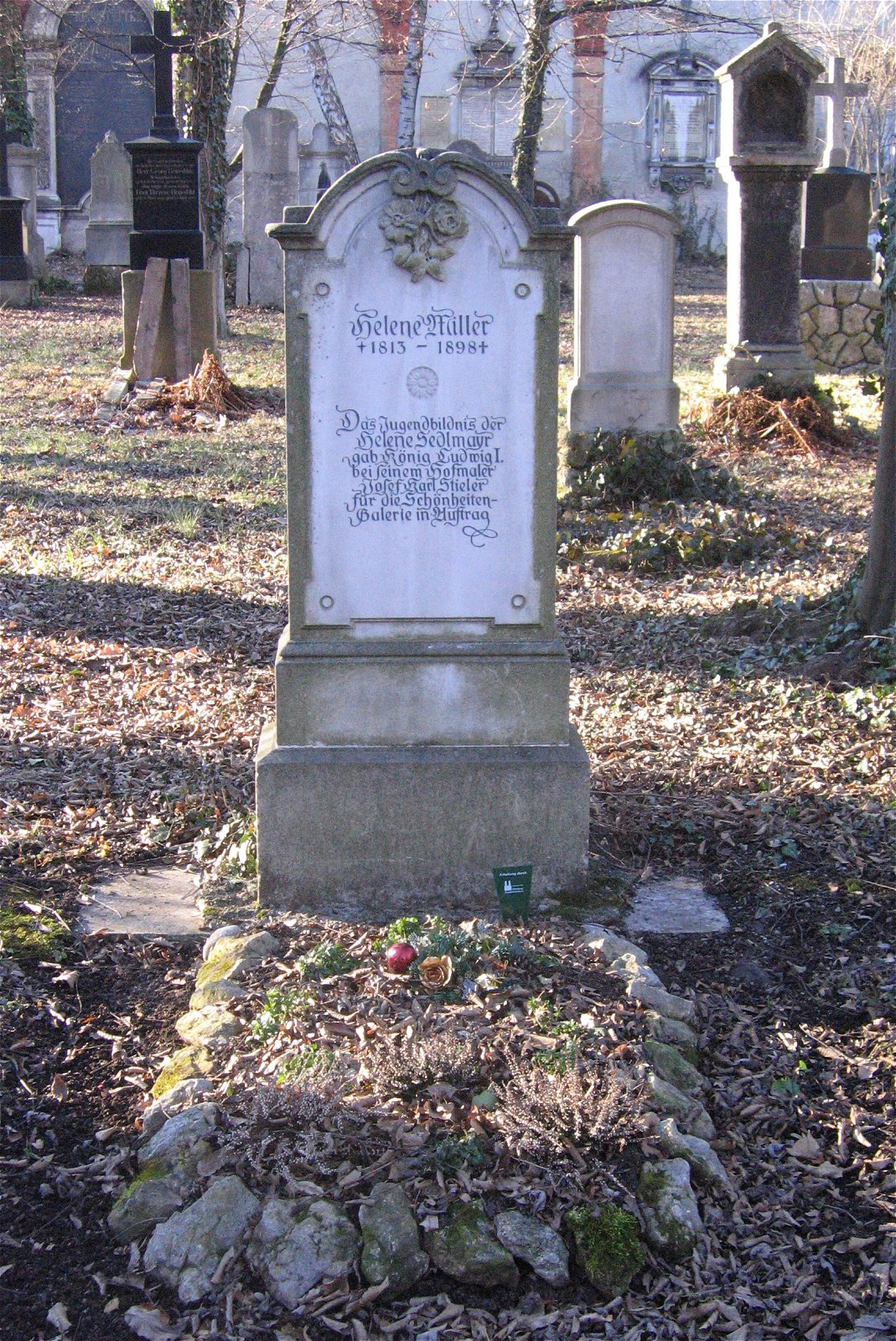
Helene's grave in Munich's Alter Südfriedhof, burial field 38, row 3, grave 25; the inscription commemorates her celebrated beauty: "King Ludwig I commissioned the youthful portrait of Helene Sedlmayr from his court painter Joseph Karl Stieler for the Gallery of Beauties."

Helene Kreszenz Sedlmayr (12 February 1813 – 18 November 1898) was a German beauty of the 19th century, considered the epitome of Munich's beauties. A shoemaker's daughter, she became known to Ludwig I of Bavaria when (aged 15) she supplied toys to his children and he commissioned a portrait of her from Stieler for his Gallery of Beauties and her portrait is one of the most famous of the 38 portrait paintings of the Beauties.

In 1831 she married the king's valet Hermes Miller (1804–1871), with whom she had 10 children.

== Life ==
Sedlmayr was born in Trostberg. The shoemaker's daughter came to Altötting in 1827 as a 14-year-old servant. A year later she changed her place of work to Munich. There, she became a runner (maid) in the toy store of the merchant Auracher on Brienner Straße. As such, she also delivered toys for the royal children to the Bavarian court and caught the eye of King Ludwig I because of her beauty. She was portrayed by the court painter Joseph Karl Stieler in the Altmünchner Gwand around 1830 for the king's gallery of beauties and was considered the epitome of the beautiful Munich woman.

"... the king even bought clothes for Helene Sedlmayr: '... to whom I gave a beautiful silver bar hood, silver chains for the bodice, a scarf, a dress ...', he noted on December 13, 1830."

On April 14, 1834, she married King Ludwig's valet Hermes Miller (1804–1871) in the Frauenkirche in Munich and became the mother of ten children: nine sons and one daughter. King Ludwig had representatives register him twice as a baptismal witness for one of her sons, Ludwig Miller (both died young). Queen Therese of Bavaria was a baptism witness for Therese Miller, Maximilian of Bavaria for Maximilian Miller (later court gardener) and Prince Luitpold of Bavaria for Luitpold Miller (also died young). The marriage was considered happy. Helene died at the age of 85 on November 18, 1898, in Munich.

== Descendants ==
Their descendants, the Miller family, still live in Berchtesgaden today.
