= Alter Südfriedhof =

Cemetery in Munich, Germany

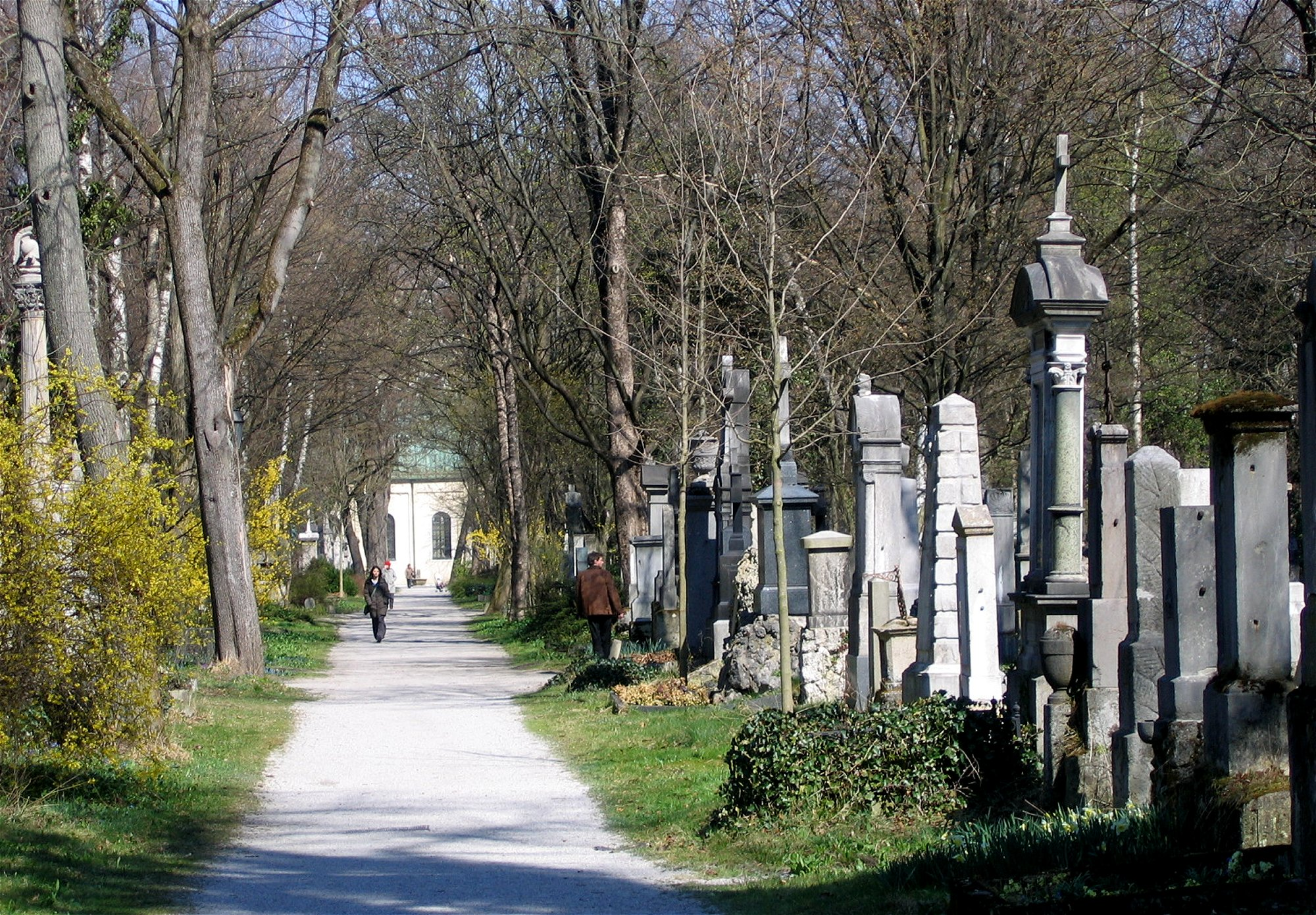
- View through the cemetery, from the north.
- Interactive map of Alter Südfriedhof

Details
- Established: 1563
- Location: Munich, Bavaria
- Country: Germany
- Coordinates: 48°07′38″N 11°33′54″E
- Type: Public (closed)
- Size: ?
- No. of graves: ?

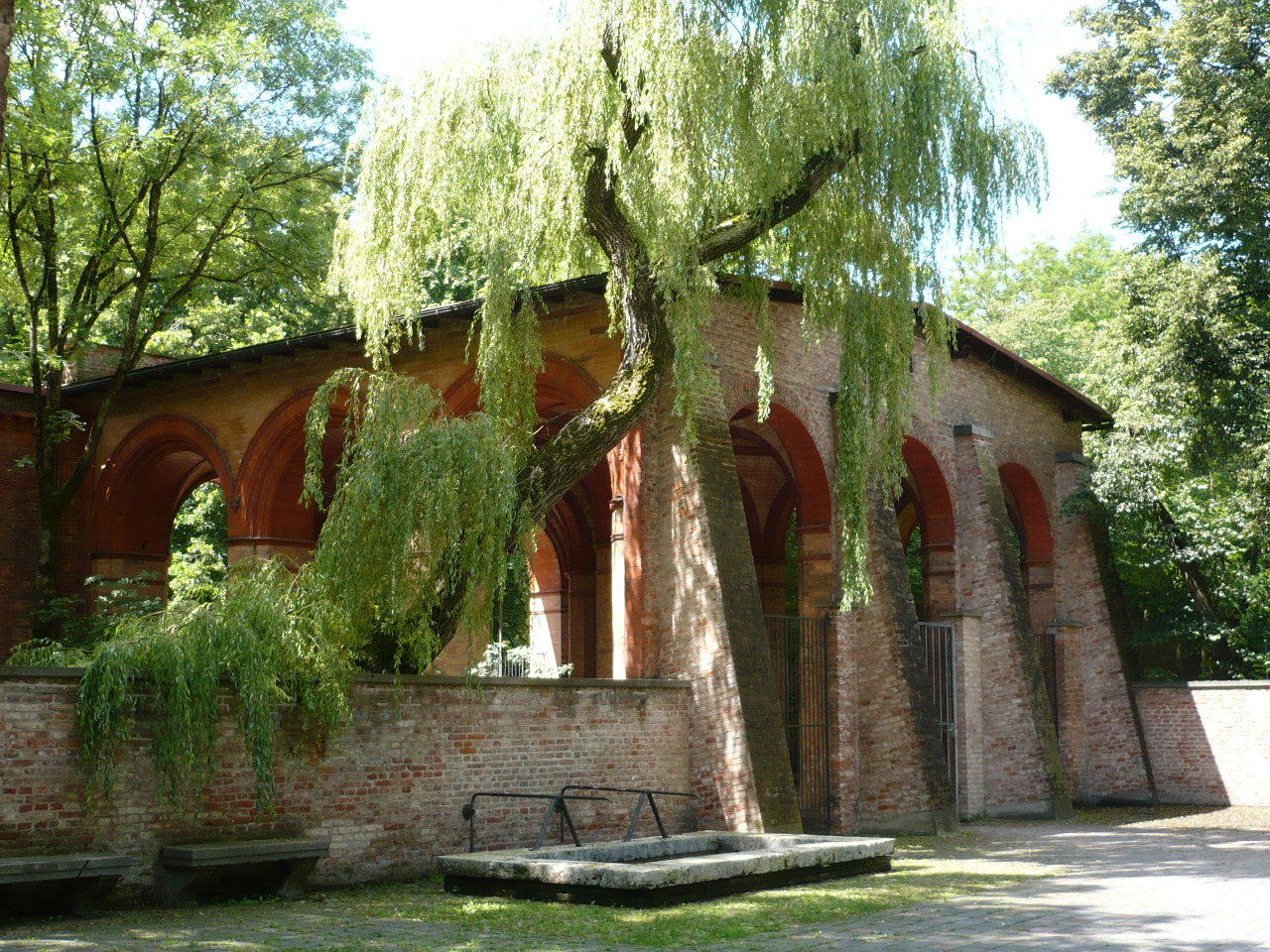
North entrance

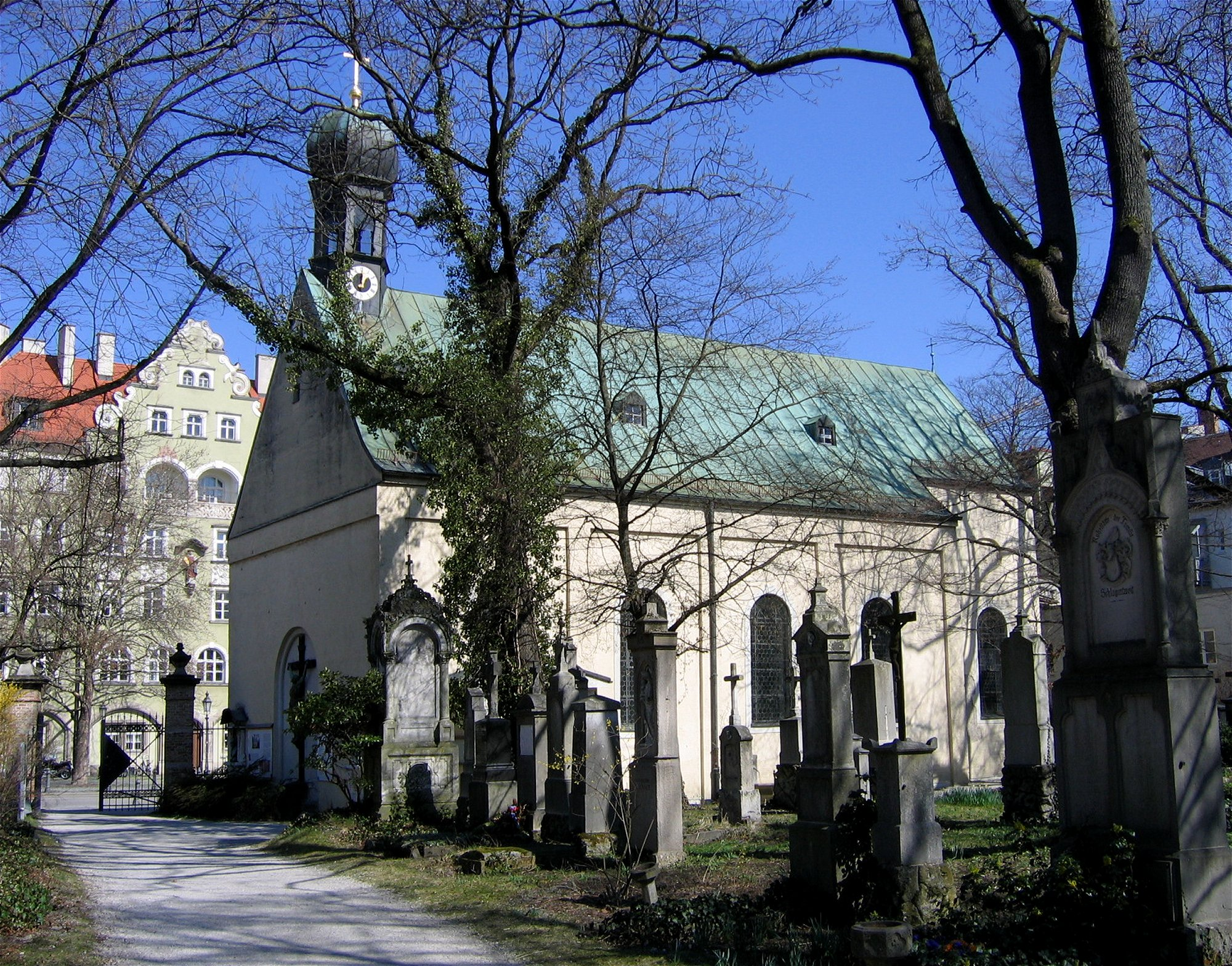
St. Stephan

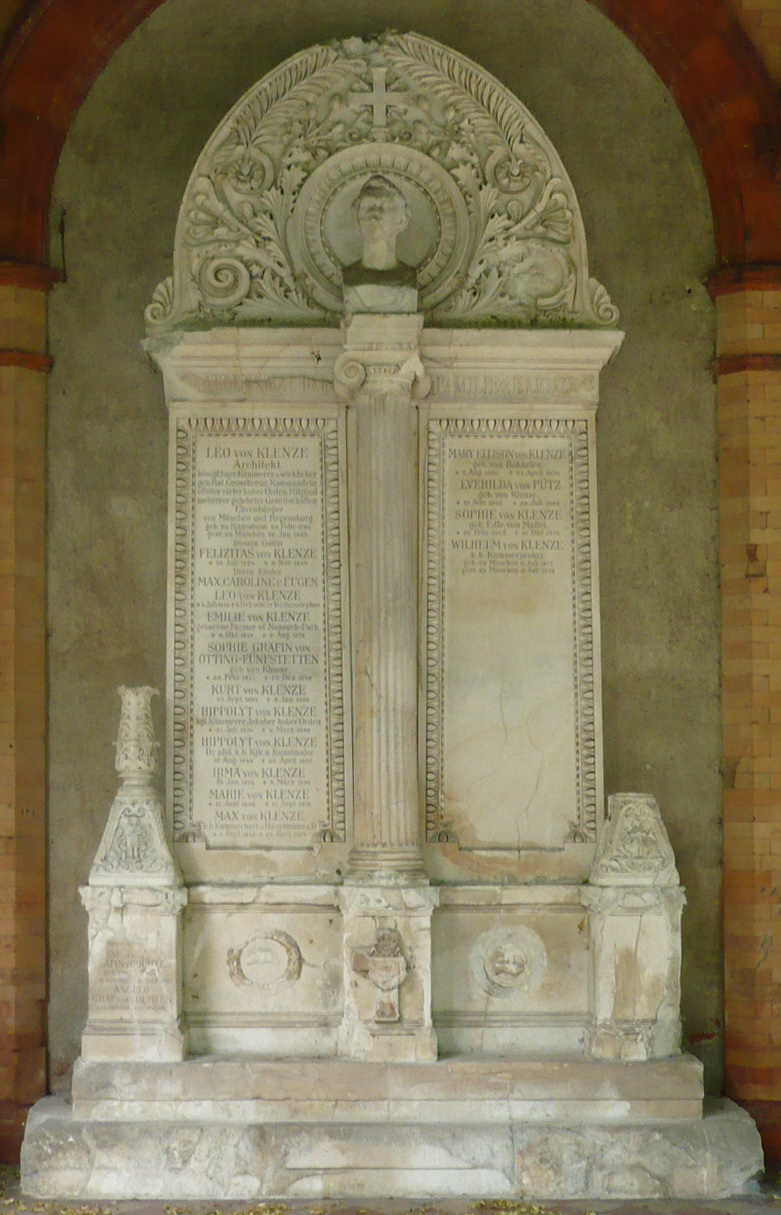
Leo von Klenze's grave

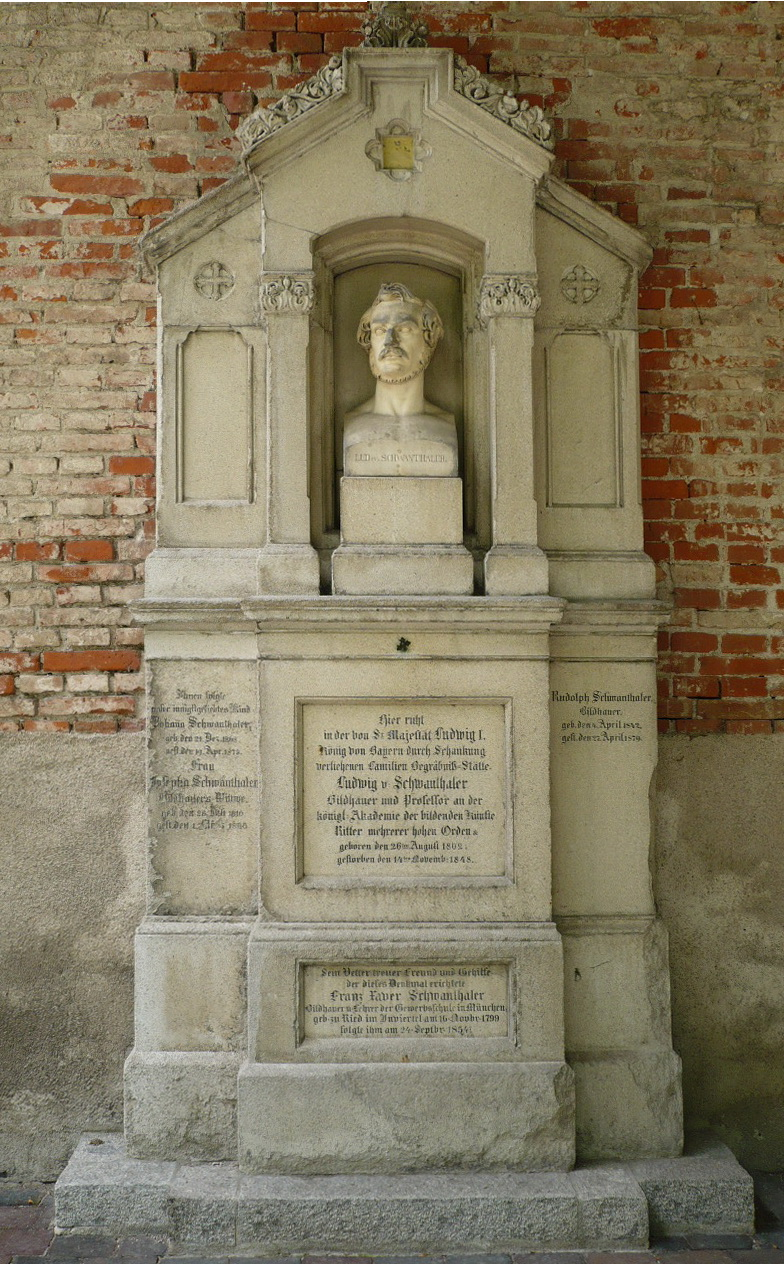
Ludwig Schwanthaler's grave

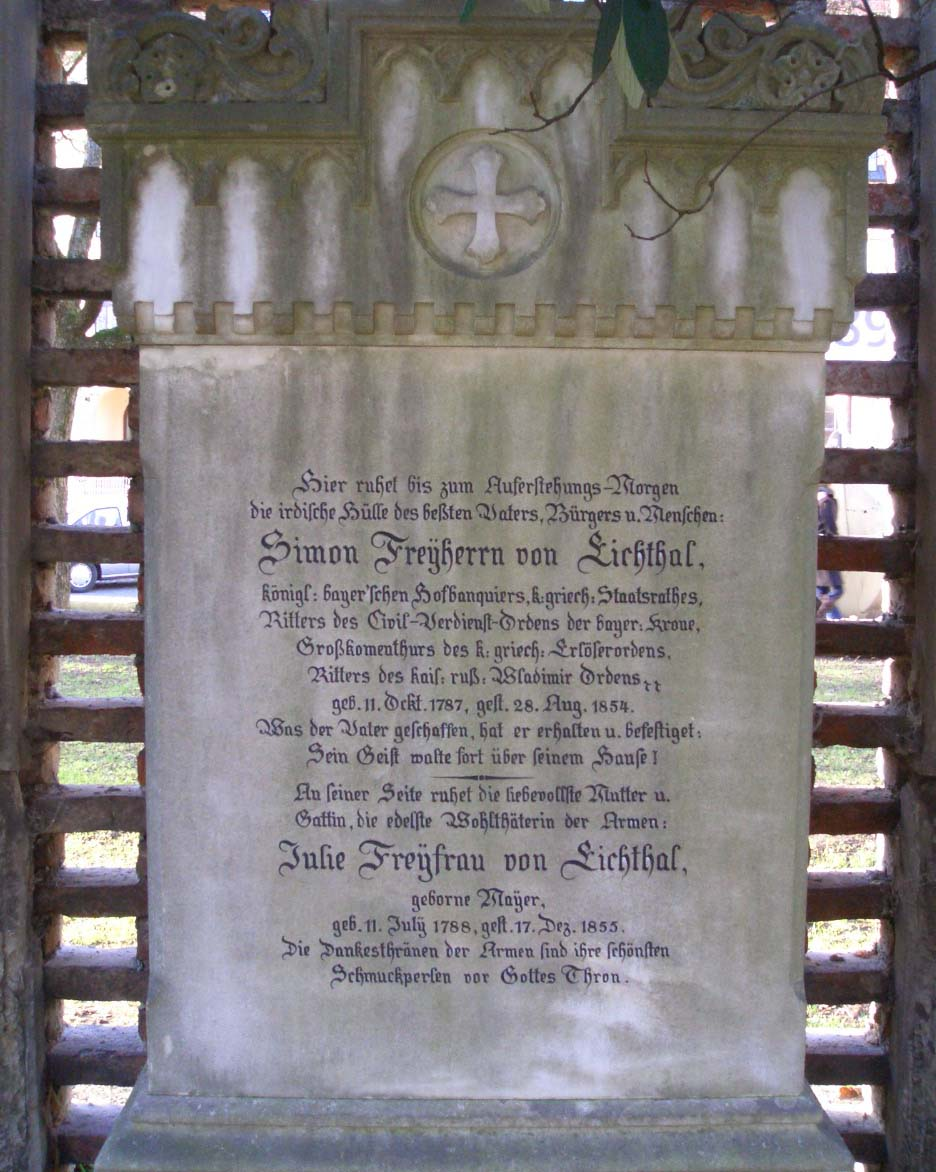
Simon Freiherr von Eichthal's gravestone – he was the co-founder of the Bayerischen Hypotheken- und Wechselbank

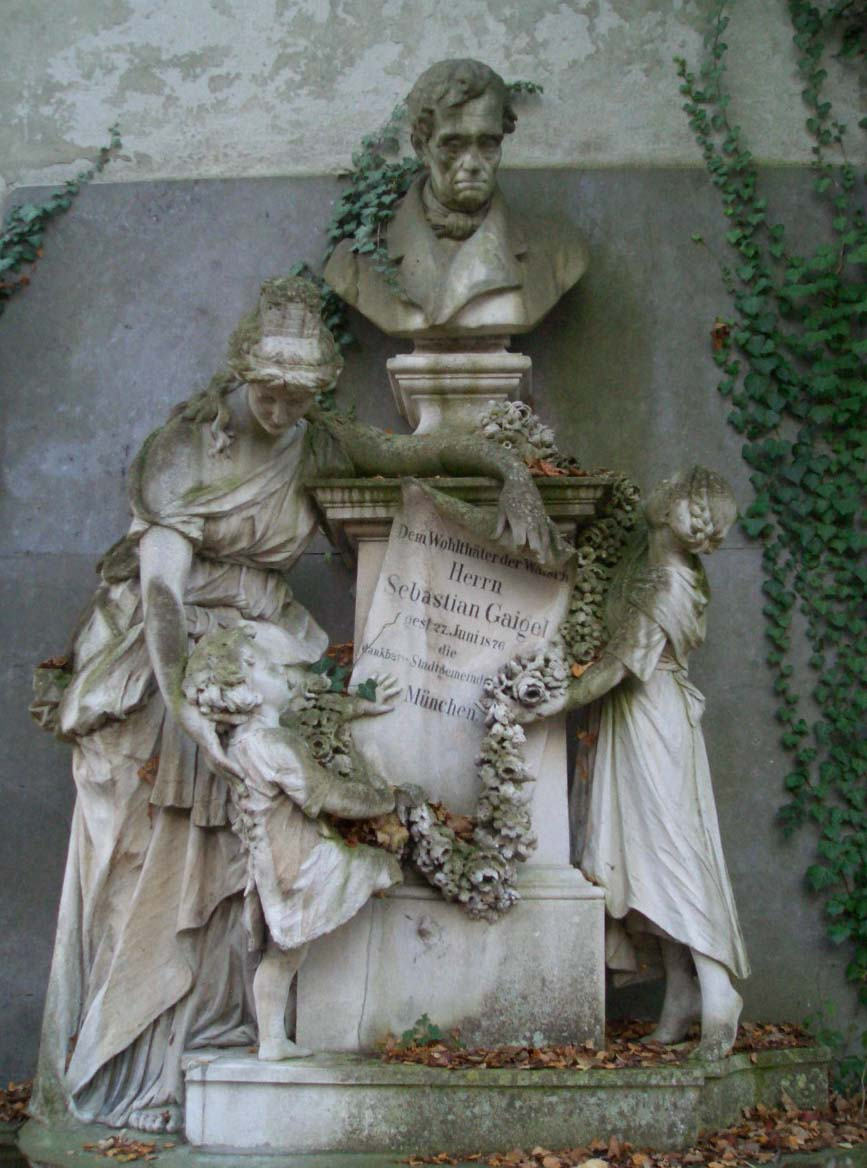
Sebastian Gaigel: Two orphans and Bavaria bring flowers (possibly by Wilhelm von Rümann?)

The Alter Südfriedhof ("Old South Cemetery"), also known as Alter Südlicher Friedhof, is a cemetery in Munich, Germany. It was founded by Duke Albrecht V as a plague cemetery in 1563 about half a kilometer south of the Sendlinger Gate between Thalkirchner and Pestalozzistraße.

== History ==
The cemetery was established in 1563, during the reign of Albert V, Duke of Bavaria, for victims of the plague and located outside the city gates. It was also the burial ground of the dead from the Sendling uprising of 1705, in which over 1100 were killed after they had surrendered to the troops of Joseph I, Holy Roman Emperor. From 1788 to 1867, it was the single collective burial ground for the dead of the city.

== Notable interments ==
Between 1788 and 1868, it served as the sole cemetery for the entire metropolitan area of Munich, resulting in the presence of notable graves belonging to several prominent figures from that period in Munich's history.

- Albrecht Adam - painter, 1786-1862
- Max Emanuel Ainmiller – painter, 1807–1870
- Franz Xaver von Baader – philosopher, 1765–1841
- Jakob Bauer – first mayor, 1787–1854
- Theodor von Bischoff – anatomist and physician, 1807–1882
- Gottlieb Bodmer – painter and lithographer, 1804–1837
- Roman Anton Boos – sculptor, 1730–1810
- Friedrich Brugger – sculptor (1815–1870)
- Friedrich Bürklein – architect, 1813–1872
- Adolf Christen – theatre director and producer, 1811–1883
- Anna Dandler – actress, 1862–1930
- Ernst Friedrich Diez – opera singer, 1805–1892
- Sophie Diez – opera singer, 1820–1887
- Johann Georg von Dillis – landscape painter, 1759–1841
- Ignaz von Döllinger – theologian, 1799–1890
- Johann Georg Edlinger – painter, 1741–1819
- Alexander Eibner – painter and painting tutor, 1862–1935
- Caspar Ett – composer, 1788–1847
- Jakob Philipp Fallmerayer – traveller, journalist, politician and historian, 1790–1861
- Carl von Fischer – architect, 1782–1820
- Ludwig Foltz – architect, sculptor and illustrator, 1809–1867
- Joseph von Fraunhofer – optician and inventor, 1787–1826
- Franz Xaver Gabelsberger – shorthand inventor, 1789–1849
- Friedrich von Gärtner – architect, 1792–1847
- Sebastian Gaigel – founder of the city orphanage, 1799–1871
- Joseph Görres – publicist, 1776–1848
- Charlotte von Hagn – actress (appears in the Gallery of Beauties), 1809–1891
- Johann von Halbig – sculptor, 1814–1882
- August von Hauner – teacher and professor, 1811–1884
- Peter von Hess – painter, 1792–1871
- Wilhelm von Kaulbach – history painter, 1805–1878
- Franz Xaver Kefer – educationalist and administrator, 1763–1802
- Leo von Klenze – architect, 1784–1864
- Franz von Kobell – mineralogist and Bavarian / Palatinate dialect poet, 1803–1882
- Alexander von Kotzebue – Russo-German battle-painter, 1815–1889
- Karl Christian Friedrich Krause – philosopher, 1781–1832
- Ludwig Lange – architect and painter, 1808–1868
- Georg Leib – Royal Councillor of Commerce and scaffolding specialist, 1846–1910
- Justus Freiherr von Liebig – chemist and natural scientist, 1803–1873
- Ferdinand von Miller – member of the Dt. Reichstag, 1813–1887
- Hermann Joseph Mitterer – art educator and administrator, 1762–1829
- Carl Friedrich Neumann – Sinologist, 1793–1870
- Eugen Napoleon Neureuther – painter, draughtsman and etcher, 1806–1882
- Johann Nepomuk von Nussbaum – surgeon, 1829–1890
- Georg Simon Ohm – physicist, 1789–1854
- Max von Pettenkofer – important physician, 1818–1901
- Ludwig von der Pfordten – Bavaria's Ministerpräsident, 1811–1880
- Christian Pram-Henningsen – Danish painter, 1846–1892
- Siegmund von Pranckh – general and Defence Minister, 1821–1888
- Georg Friedrich von Reichenbach – inventor and engineer, 1772–1826
- Josef Gabriel Rheinberger – composer and music teacher from Liechtenstein, 1839–1901
- Karl Rottmann – landscape painter, 1798–1830
- Eduard Schleich the Elder – painter, 1813–1874
- Friedrich Ludwig von Sckell – landscape gardener, 1750–1823
- Ludwig Schwanthaler – sculptor, 1802–1848
- Moritz von Schwind – painter, 1804–1871
- Helene Sedlmayr – symbol of Schönen Münchnerin in the Gallery of Beauties, 1813–1898
- Franz von Seitz – painter, lithographer and costume painter, 1817–1883
- Otto Seitz – painter and teacher, 1846–1912
- Alois Senefelder – inventor of lithography, 1771–1834
- Johann Nepomuk Sepp – historian and politician, 1816–1909
- Carl Spitzweg – painter and apothecary, 1808–1885
- Carl August von Steinheil – physicist, 1801–1870
- Alexander Strähuber or 'Straehuber' (1814–1882), history painter, book illustrator and art professor
- Friedrich Wilhelm von Thiersch – "Praeceptor Bavariae", 1784–1860
- Gustav Vorherr – architect, 1778–1847
- Franz Widnmann – painter and graphic artist, and professor 1846–1910
- Klara Ziegler – actress and theatre founder, 1844–1909
- Anton Zwengauer – landscape painter, 1810–1884

== Current use ==
The cemetery today serves as an Art and Cultural history monument, and is open to the public as an official Munich park. Most of the monuments, which suffered from exposure to weather and pollution, have been renovated and cleaned, in a three-year project (2004–2007). The St. Stephan's church has also been renovated.
