= Neureuther =

Neureuther is a family surname.

People with the surname include:

- Ameli Neureuther (born 1981), German fashion designer
- Christian Neureuther (born 1949), German World Cup alpine ski racer
- Eugen Napoleon Neureuther (1806–1882), German painter, etcher and illustrator
- Felix Neureuther (born 1984), German World Cup alpine ski racer
- Günther Neureuther (born 1955), German former judoka
- Rosi Mittermaier-Neureuther (1950–2023), German female alpine skier
