= Jean-Nicolas-Louis Durand =

French author, teacher and architect

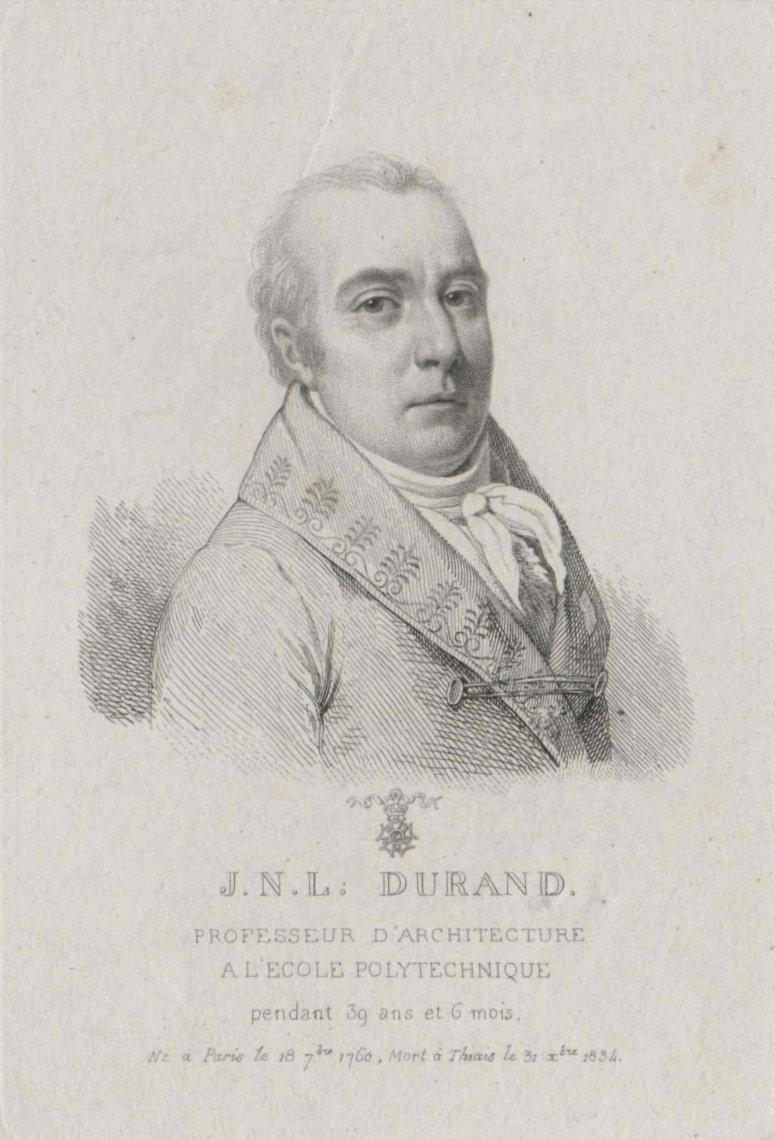
Jean-Nicolas-Louis Durand

Jean-Nicolas-Louis Durand (French pronunciation: [ʒɑ̃ nikɔla lwi dyʁɑ̃]; Paris, 18 September 1760 – Thiais, 31 December 1834) was a French writer, teacher and architect. He was an important figure in Neoclassicism, and his system of design using simple modular elements anticipated modern industrialized building components. Having spent periods working for the architect Étienne-Louis Boullée and the civil engineer Jean-Rodolphe Perronet, he became a Professor of Architecture at the École Polytechnique in 1795.

== See also ==
- Étienne-Louis Boullée
- Leo von Klenze
- Gustav Vorherr
- Friedrich Weinbrenner
