= Franz Hanfstaengl =

German painter (1804–1877)

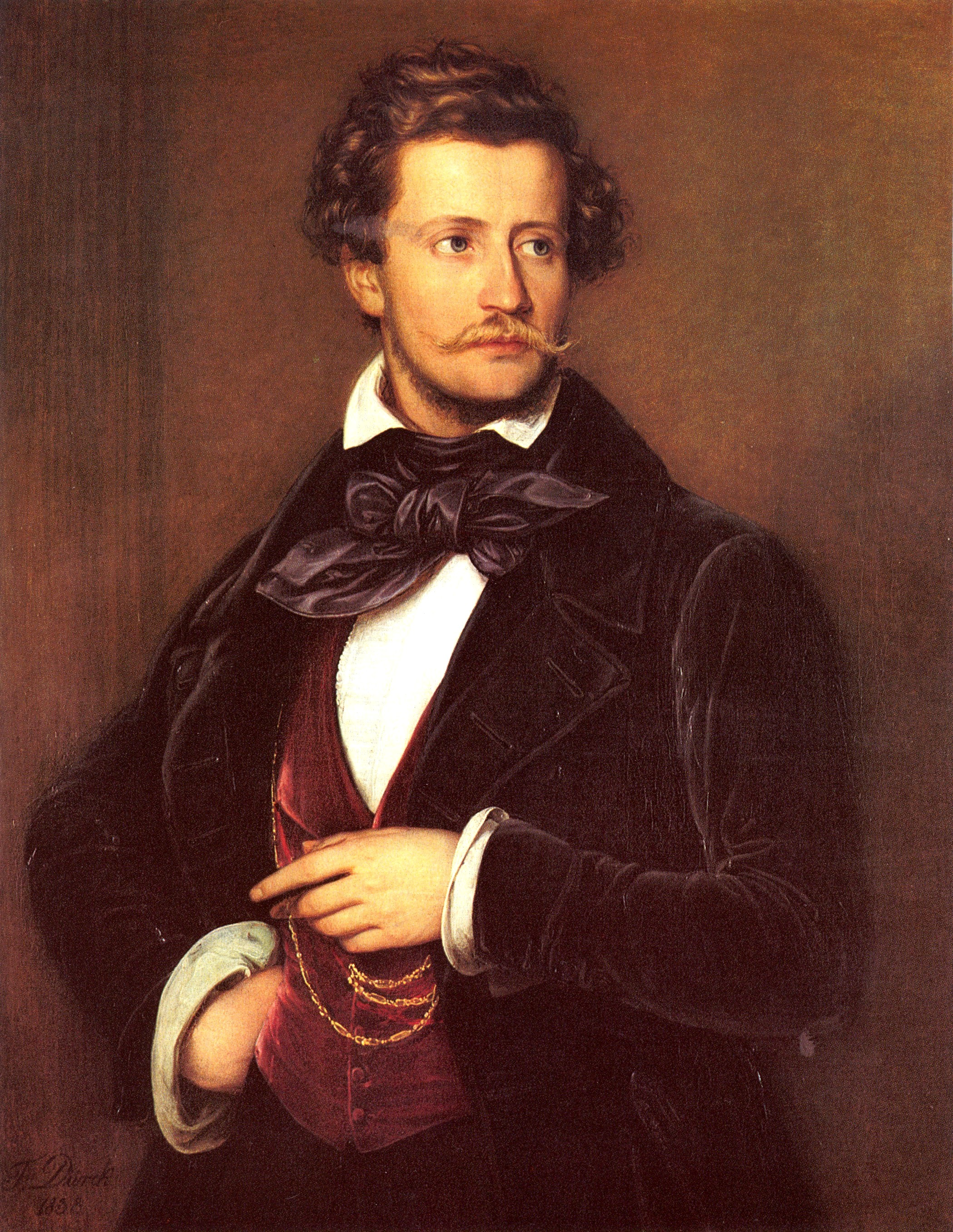
1832 portrait of Hanfstaengl by Friedrich Dürck

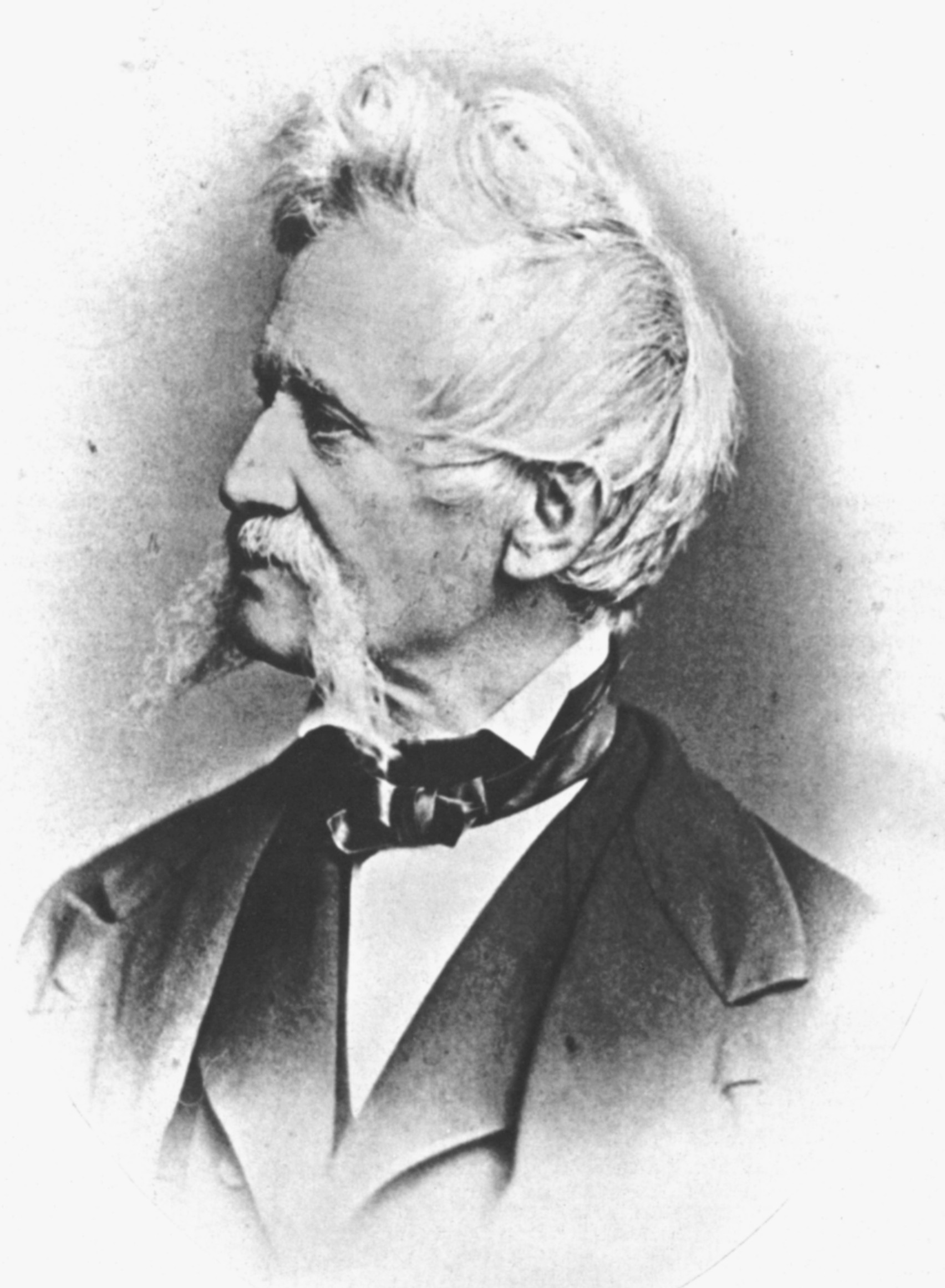
Hanfstaengl in later life

Franz Seraph Hanfstaengl (1 March 1804 in Baiernrain near Bad Tölz – 18 April 1877 in Munich) was a Bavarian painter, lithographer, and photographer.

== Life ==
Hanfstaengl originated from a commoner family and in 1816 came on the recommendation of the town-school-teachers into the drawing-class of the leave-day school at Munich led by Hermann Joseph Mitterer. He was instructed in lithography, he had contact with Alois Senefelder and studied from 1819 to 1825 at the Munich Academy of Fine Arts. In 1826, he went to Dresden and began his great work, completed in 1852, of copying in lithograph the canvases of the Dresden Gallery. Between 1835 and 1852, Hanfstaengl brought out about 200 lithographic reproductions of masterworks from the Dresden picture-gallery, and published them in a portfolio. When he returned to Munich, he left his establishment at Dresden to his brothers Max and Hans.

In 1833, he founded in Munich a lithographic establishment of his own, which he operated until 1868, and to which he later attached a fine art printing shop and (in 1853) a photographic workshop. Hanfstaengl won for himself much popularity as the portrait lithographer of Munich society, being nicknamed 'Count Litho'. Later, he became court photographer and produced portraits of distinguished persons, amongst others of the young King Ludwig II, of Franz Liszt, Otto von Bismarck and Empress Elisabeth of Austria. In 1858, Hanfstaengl tutored renowned French photographer Antoine Samuel Adam-Salomon.

He influenced his brother-in-law, the Austrian physician, inventor and politician Norbert Pfretzschner senior in the evolving of the photographic dry-plate in 1866. He was married to Franziska Wegmeier (1809–1860), by whom he became the father of Edgar Hanfstaengl. Another family member, Erwin von Hanfstaengl, in 1873 married the opera-singer Marie Schröder.

== Gallery ==
Photographs by Franz Hanfstaengl

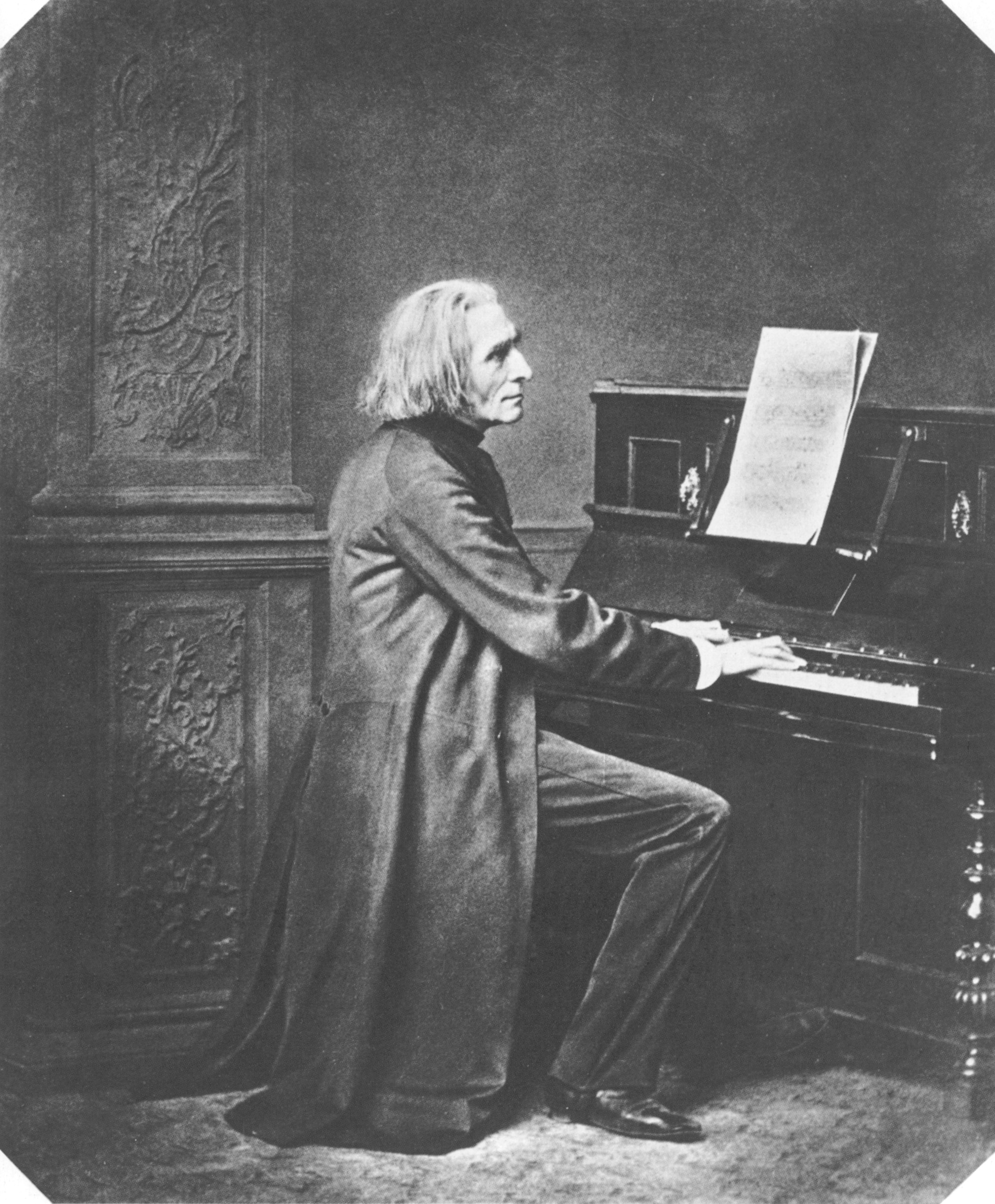
Franz Liszt

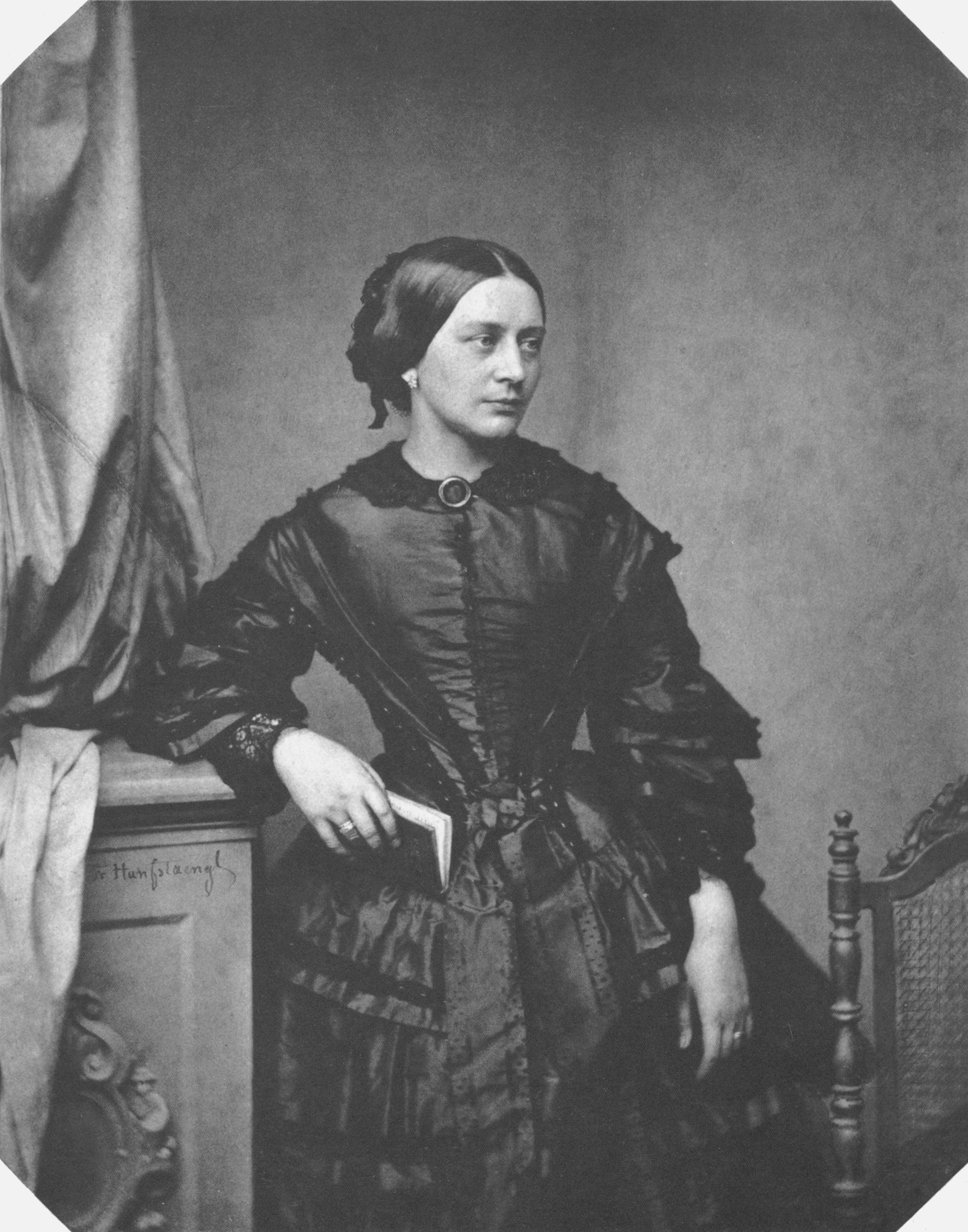
Clara Schumann

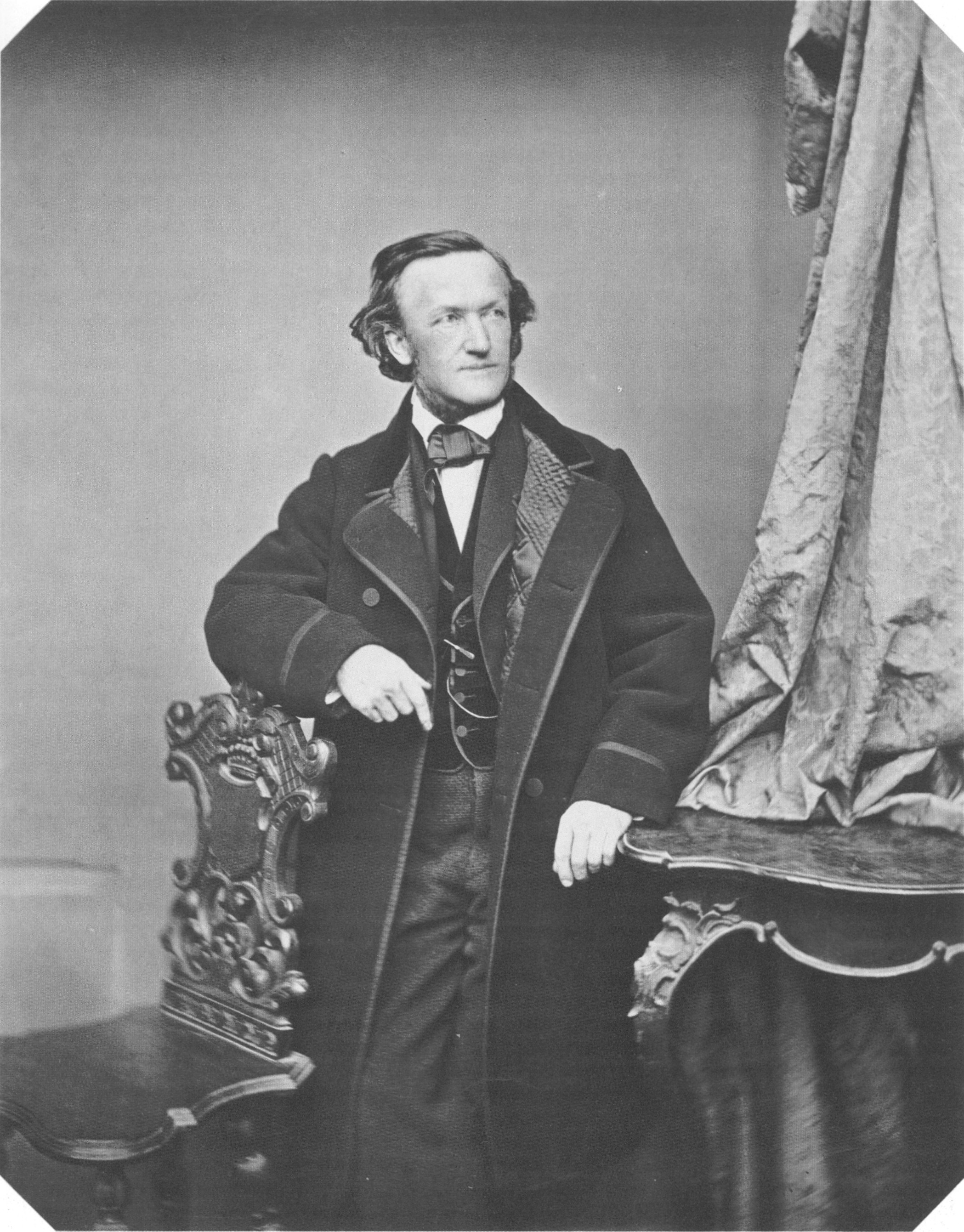
Richard Wagner

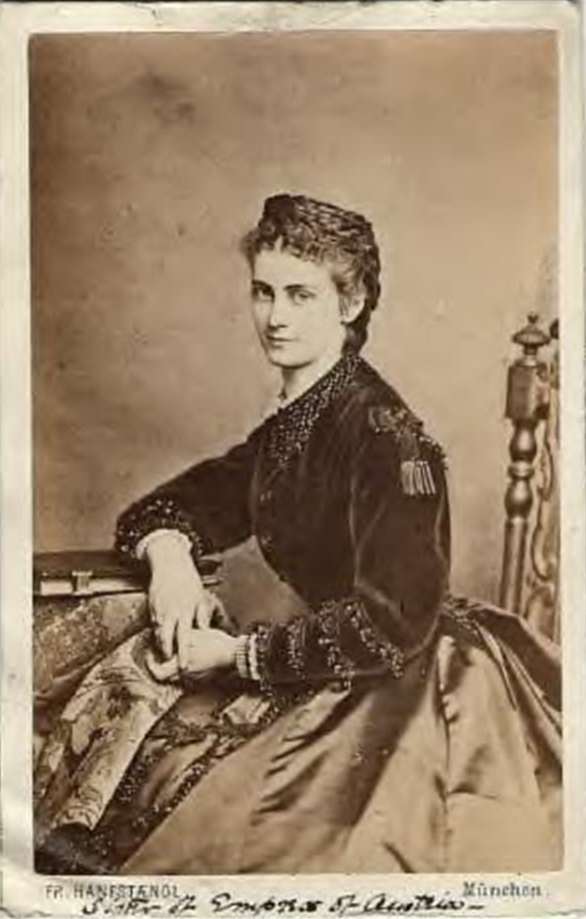
Duchess Sophie Charlotte in Bavaria

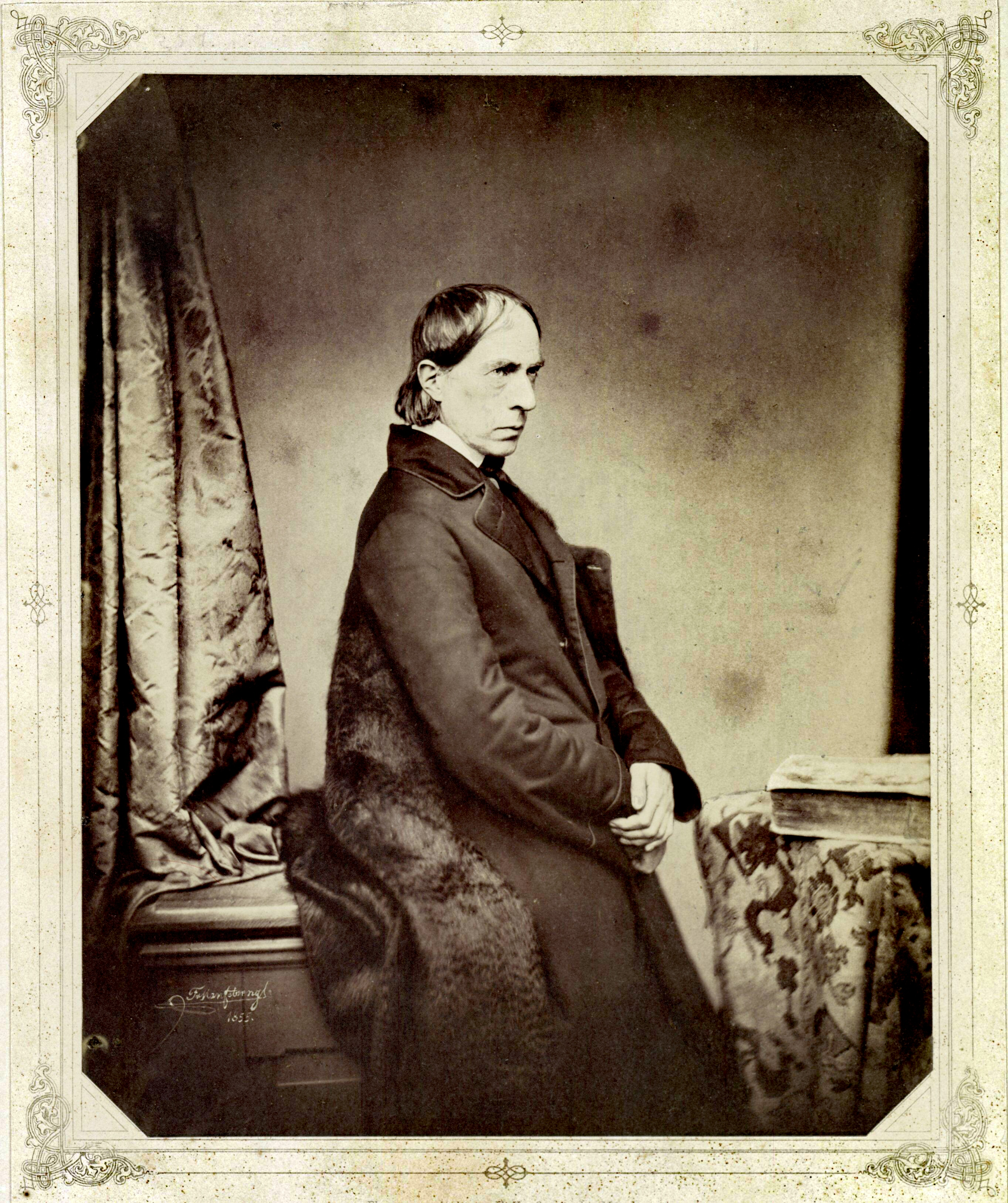
Johann Friedrich Overbeck
