= Anton Georg Zwengauer =

German painter

Anton Georg Zwengauer (12 June 1850 – 18 January 1928) was a German painter. He was the son of painter Anton Zwengauer, and studied with Arthur von Ramberg from 1871 until 1874. Ludwig II of Bavaria was his patron beginning in 1869. He was born in München.
