= Adolf Christen =

German actor, theater director and theater manager

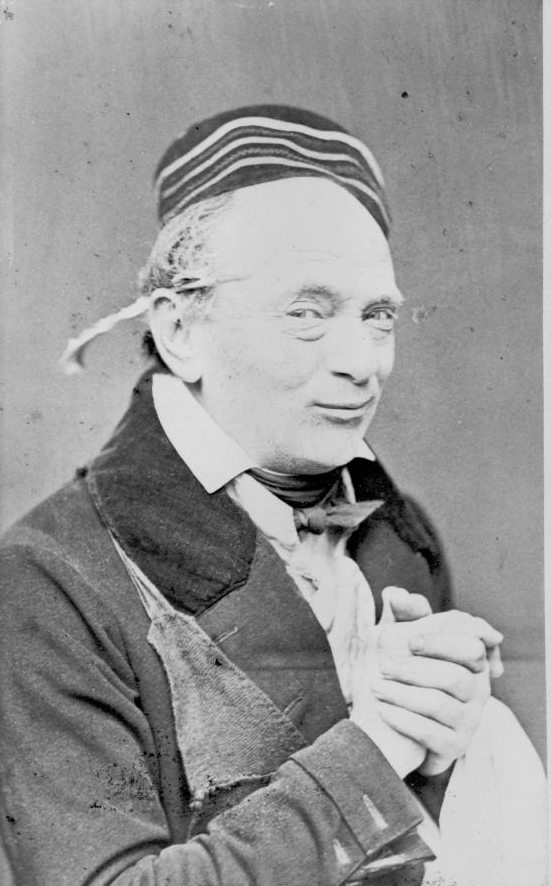
- Born: 7 August 1811; Berlin, Kingdom of Prussia
- Died: 13 July 1883 (aged 71); Munich, German Empire
- Occupations: stage actor, theater director, theater manager
- Spouse: Klara Ziegler

Adolf Christen (7 August 1811 – 13 July 1883) was a Bavarian stage actor, theater director and theater manager of the old Munich "Aktientheater".

Christen was born in Berlin. When the father of the actress Klara Ziegler died he got the wardship of her. First he declined her wish to become actress but later he taught her. In 1876 he married her.

He died in Munich. The family grave is at the Old Southern Cemetery in Munich.
