= Anton Zwengauer =

German painter

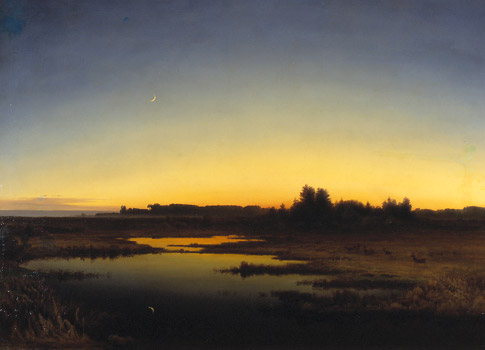
Anton Zwengauer: Sonnenuntergang ("Sunset")

Anton Zwengauer (11 October 1810 – 13 June 1884) was a German painter of the Biedermeier period.

== Life ==
Zwengauer was born in Munich, Bavaria. He studied at the Academy of Art in his home town under, among others, Peter von Cornelius. Zwengauer found himself attracted to landscape painting, in which there was no formal training at the Academy, and at the age of 17 he therefore began to travel through the Bavarian and Austrian Alps, returning from each trip with large quantities of sketches and watercolours. His artistic breakthrough came with his painting Sonnenuntergang im Dachauer Moos ("Sunset in the Dachauer Moos"), which immediately became well-known and much-discussed in the Munich art world. His sunsets became so well known that all paintings with sunsets were referred to, half admiringly and half ironically, as "Zwengauers".

In 1835, Maximilian II, King of Bavaria, appointed him conservator of the picture gallery of Schloss Schleissheim and in 1869 promoted him to the same post in the royal picture gallery, the later Alte Pinakothek.

In the selection of his motifs Zwengauer always tried to represent the inherent strength and peace of natural landscapes in an almost solemn mood. He often painted sunsets, in which he aimed to achieve impressive effects of light and colour by simple means.

Zwengauer died aged 73 on 13 June 1884 in Munich and is buried in the Alter Südfriedhof. A street in Solln in south Munich - Zwengauerweg - is named after him.

The landscape painter Anton Georg Zwengauer was his son, the Bavarian Lieutenant-General Karl Zwengauer his grandson.

== Selected works ==
- Nachtmahl auf dem Berg ("Supper on the Mountain") (1841)
- Herbstabend mit Hirsch am Wasser ("Autumn Evening with Deer by Water"): Neue Pinakothek, Munich
- Benediktenwand im Abendlicht ("Benediktenwand in the Evening Light"): Pinakothek, Munich
- Die vier Tageszeiten ("The Four Times of the Day")
- Hirsche am See nach Sonnenuntergang ("Deer by a Lake after Sunset") - Museum der bildenden Künste, Leipzig

== Literature ==
- Hyacinth Holland (1900). "Zwengauer, Anton" . Allgemeine Deutsche Biographie (in German). Vol. 45. Leipzig: Duncker & Humblot. pp. 524–526.
