= Georg Leib =

German businessman

Georg Leib's Gravestone - Alter Südlicher Friedhof in Munich

Georg Leib (9 March 1846 in Wallerstein – 1910 in Munich) was the Royal Councillor of Commerce and ran a very successful real-estate company in Munich.

Georg Leib was a scaffolding-specialist and philanthropist. He was the head of the Bavarian County Administration. There are two streets named after him, one in Munich and one in Haar .

After the trademark tower of Venice, (St Mark's Campanile), collapsed in 1902, Leib donated the scaffolding for it to rebuild it. The majority wanted to tear the tower down at the time. Georg Leib was the first philanthropist to donate to the cause of rebuilding Venice's tower. Leib also built the scaffolding for the Dome of Milan, (Milan Cathedral), the original Thalkirchner Bridge - and the Sanatorium named after him in Haar, Munich. The latter was the first institution of the kind in Germany. Georg Leib was one of the builders of St. Joseph's Cloister (St Joseph (München). He donated his services to build St. Anton's in Munich (St. Anton (München)), and was awarded the royal prince regent's medal of the Order of St. Michael, forth class, for his efforts. Moreover, he was awarded the papal medal of St. Gregory the Great in honor of his services to the community and the Catholic Church. He was also awarded honorary membership of the Order of Friars Minor Capuchin.

Georg Leib is buried in the Old Cemetery (Alter Südlicher Friedhof) in Munich (grave section 31-1-2). Georg Leib's daughter Sophie married the royal privy councillor Max Niedermayer, who became an honorary citizen of Landshut (Liste der Ehrenbürger von Landshut). Both Georg Leib and Max Niedermayer have streets named after them in Munich: Leibweg in Bogenhausen leads directly into the Niedermayerstrasse. Georg Leib's descendants were his grandson Otto Leib, and granddaughter Lea von Langsdorff who married one of the first private and artistic pilots, Hans von Langsdorff.
