= Johann Nepomuk von Nussbaum =

German surgeon (1829–1890)

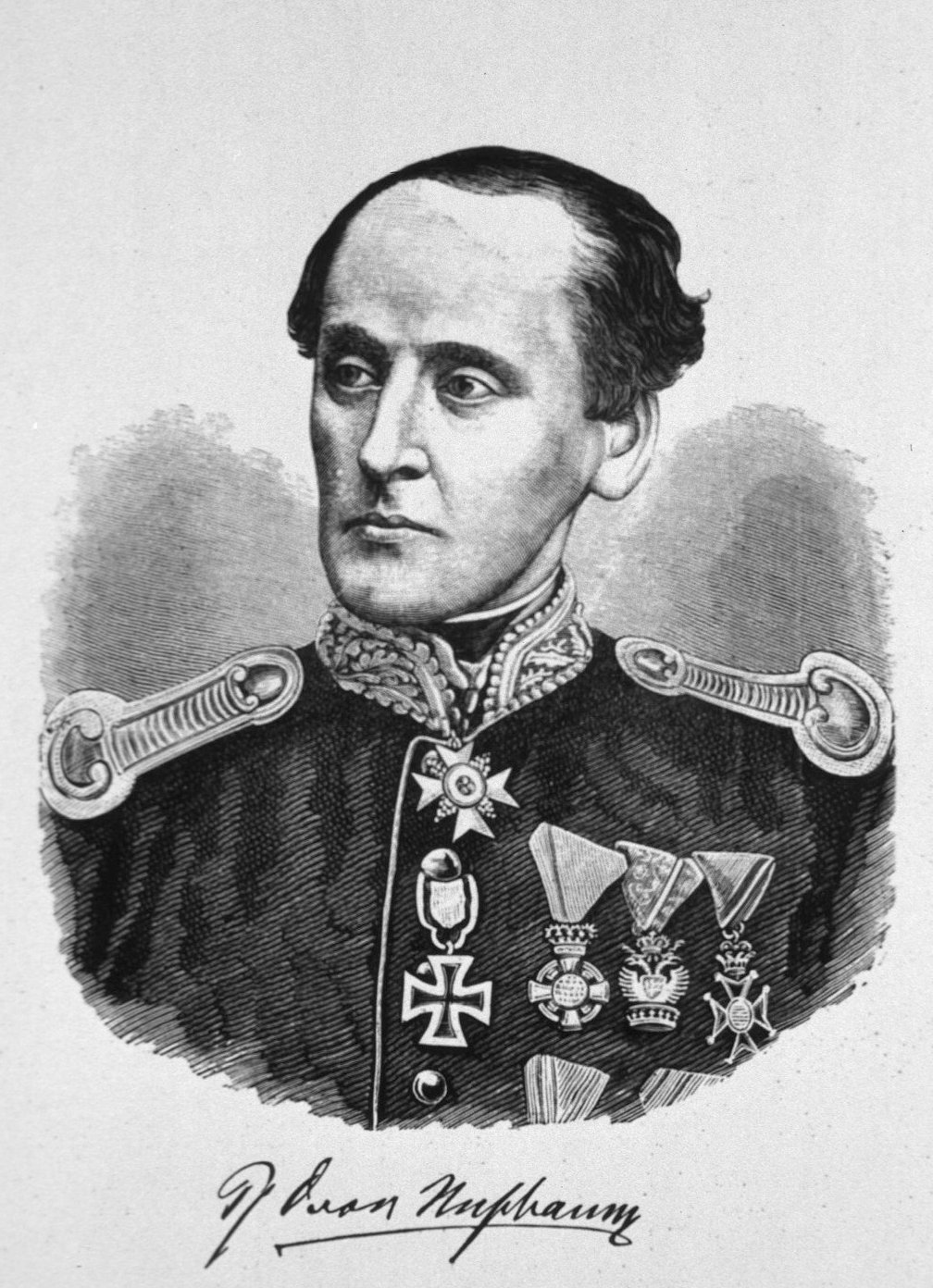
Ritter von Nussbaum

Johann Nepomuk Ritter von Nussbaum (2 September 1829 – 31 October 1890) was a German surgeon who was a native of Munich.

In 1853, he earned his medical doctorate from the Ludwig-Maximilians-Universität München, where he studied under Karl Thiersch (1822–1895) and Franz Christoph von Rothmund (1801–1891). In the following years, he continued his surgical studies with Auguste Nélaton (1807–1873), Charles Chassaignac (1805–79) and Jules Maisonneuve (1809–1897) at the University of Paris, and under Bernhard von Langenbeck (1810–1887) at the Friedrich Wilhelm University of Berlin. During the early 1870s, he travelled to England, where he learned techniques of pelvic surgery under Thomas Spencer Wells (1818–1897). From 1860 until 1890, Nussbaum was a professor of surgery at the Ludwig-Maximilians-Universität München. During the Franco-Prussian War he served as a medical consultant for Bavarian troops.

Nussbaum is remembered for the development of innovative surgical operations, and the introduction of Lister's antiseptic practices into surgery at the Ludwig-Maximilians-Universität München. Prior to antisepsis in Munich, there was an extremely high rate of death due to operative infection. Nussbaum's popular book on antiseptic treatment of wounds, Leitfaden zur antiseptischen Wundbehandlung, was later translated into several languages.

He also published significant works on eye surgery, ovariotomy and bone transplantation. A device designed for use with writer's cramp, "Nussbaum's bracelet", is named after him.

He is buried in the Alter Südfriedhof in Munich, Germany.
