= Klara Ziegler =

German actress and writer (1844–1909)

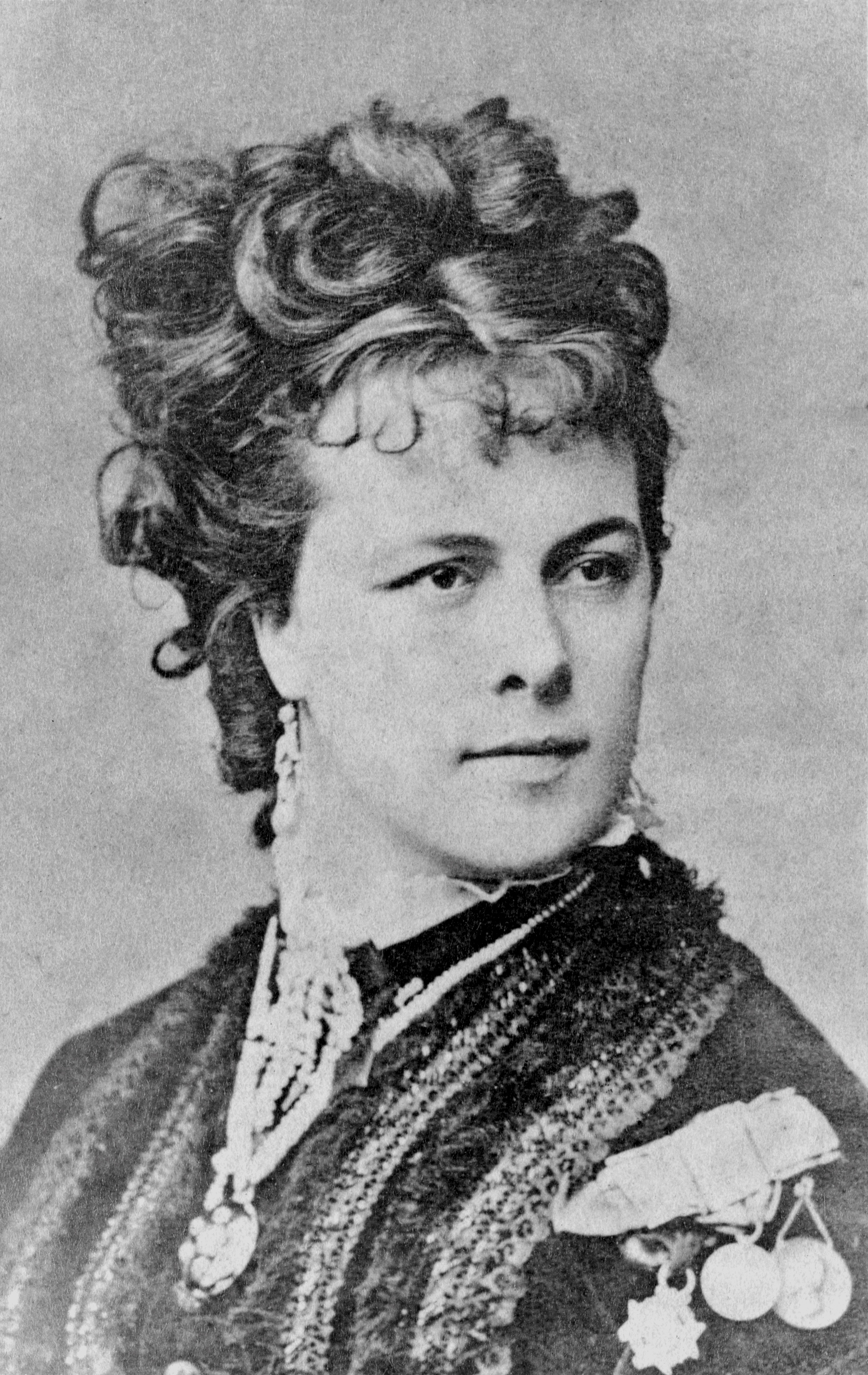
Klara Ziegler

Klara Ziegler, also Clara Ziegler, (27 April 1844 – 19 December 1909) was a German stage actress and writer.

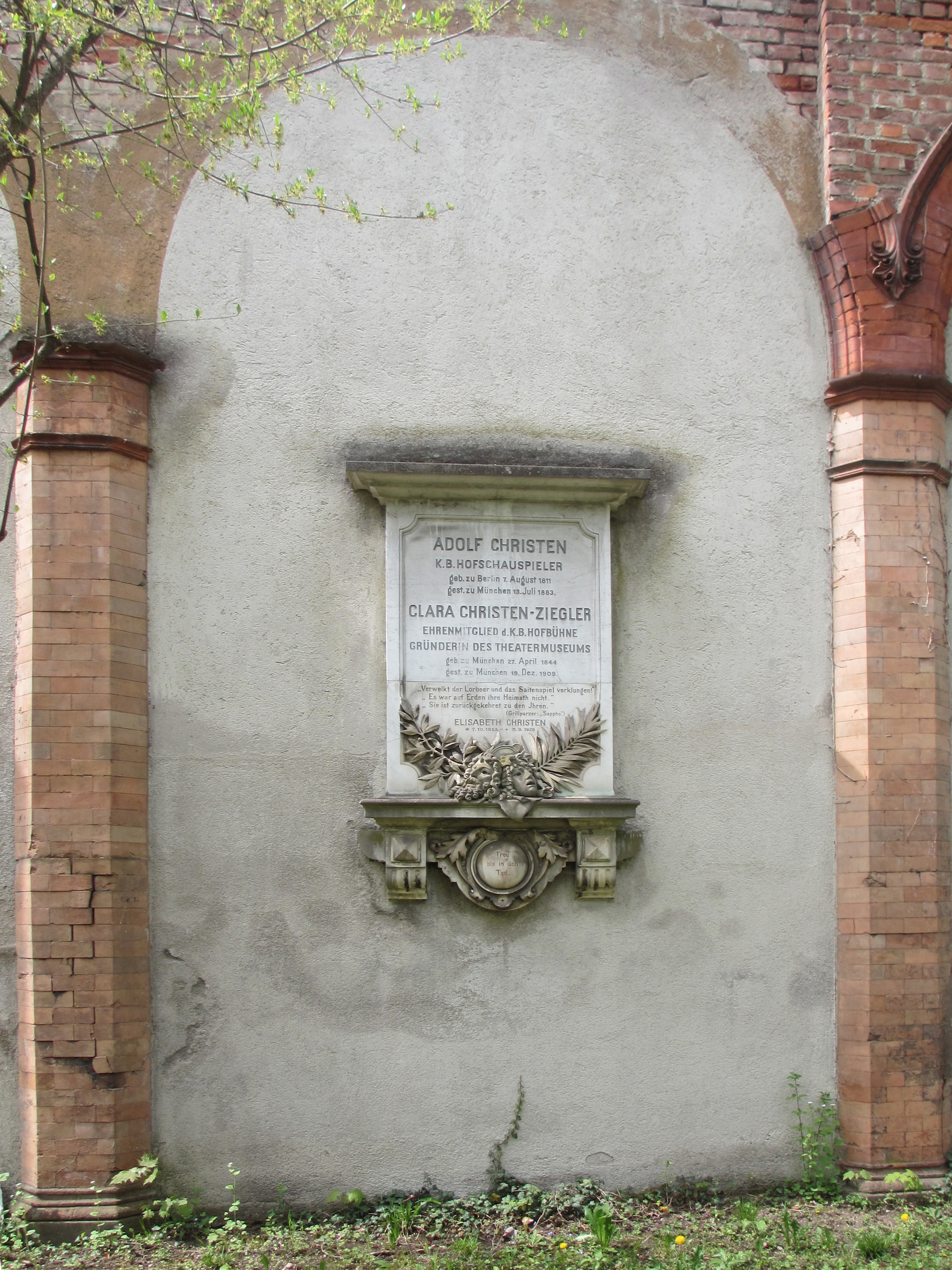
[Grave of Klara Ziegler and her husband Adolf Christen at the Alter Südfriedhof in Munich (Neu Arkaden Platz 121 near Gräberfeld 38) – 48°7′31.40″N 11°33′44.70″E

== Life ==
Born in Munich, Ziegler, the daughter of a whitewashing owner, was to marry a highly respected, wealthy man at her mother's request after the death of her father (1860). However, she did not want to and took acting lessons from the court actor Adolf Christen, a long-time friend of the family.

Ziegler gave her debut at the Stadttheater in Ulm and had her first role (under the pseudonym Herzfeld) in 1862 at the E.T.A.-Hoffmann-Theater as The Maid of Orleans, then went for the same role to the Nationaltheater München and to the Staatstheater am Gärtnerplatz, where she had great success. Thereupon, she accepted an engagement as "first heroine" in Ulm, where she stayed with a short interruption until 1865.

Later, she went to the newly founded "Münchener Aktien-Volkstheater" (from 1872 Königl. Staatstheater am Gärtnerplatz) in Munich, which was directed by her teacher Adolf Christen, and inaugurated the theatre as Isarnixe on November 4, 1865. She later accepted an engagement at the Altes Theater in Leipzig, but returned to Munich after only one year, where she was engaged at the court theatre in 1868. In 1870 and 1871, she accepted guest roles at the Staatsoper Hamburg and the Thalia-Theater in Hamburg.

Ziegler gave guest performances at almost all renowned theatres. In 1874, she left the Hoftheater in Munich at her request, and after that, she only had guest roles. On 11 August 1876, she married her teacher Adolf Christen, who was 33 years older than her. His death in 1883 depressed her so much that she didn't go on stage for two years.

Ziegler was famous for her speech technique and her expressive gestures and facial expressions. Besides tragedies, she also excelled in comedies. Her leading roles were: Medea, Iphigenie, Maria Stuart, Isabella and Donna Diana. From 1888, she played at the Berliner Theater. A serious illness put an end to her theatre career and she died in 1909 in Munich at the age of 65. (Klara Ziegler at the Internet Archive).

One year after her death, the Clara Ziegler Foundation was founded and a theatre museum was opened in her castle-like villa in Munich near the English Garden. The Ziegler villa was destroyed during the bombing in 1944, but the museum was reopened in 1953 in the Hofgarten, which became a state museum in 1979, the current Deutsches Theatermuseum.

Her bust was installed in April 2000 in the Ruhmeshalle in Munich. It was completed by the academic sculptor Toni Preis, from Munich.

== Burial site ==
Ziegler is buried together with her husband Adolf Christen on the Alter Südfriedhof in Munich (Neu Arkaden Platz 121 bei Gräberfeld 38) 48°7′31.40″N 11°33′44.70″E.

== Roles ==
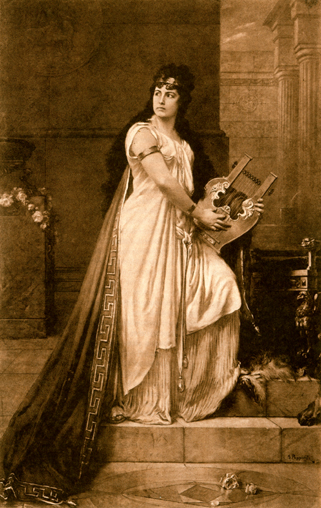
Klara Ziegler as Medea

- Jeanne d'Arc – The Maid of Orleans (Friedrich Schiller)
- Medea – Medea (Euripides)
- Iphigenie – Iphigenie auf Tauris (Johann Wolfgang von Goethe)
- Maria Stuart – Maria Stuart (Friedrich Schiller)
- Donna Diana – Donna Diana (Emil Nikolaus von Reznicek after Agustin Moreto)
- Brunhild – Die Nibelungen (Hebbel) (Friedrich Hebbel)
- Elisabeth – Graf Essex (Heinrich Laube)
- Gräfin Orsina – Emilia Galotti (Gotthold Ephraim Lessing)
- Judith – Judith (Friedrich Hebbel)
- Sappho – Sappho (Franz Grillparzer)
- Penthesilea – Penthesilea (Kleist) (Heinrich von Kleist)
- Thusnelda – Der Fechter von Ravenna (Friedrich Halm)

== Publications ==
- Falscher Verdacht. Verlag Ackermann, Munich 1897.
- Flirten. Lustspiel in einem Aufzug. Reclam, Leipzig 1895.
- Furcht vor der Schwiegermutter. Schwank in einem Aufzug. Reclam, Leipzig 1896 (free zadaptation from M. Knauff)
- Mucki. Verlag Ackermann, Munich 1904.
- Der Türmer von St. Peter. Türmers Weihnachtsfest. Zwei ernste Lebensbilder in je einem Akt. Verlag Ackermann, Munich 1897.

== Student ==
- Philomene Hartl-Mitius
