= Franz Xaver Kefer =

German educator

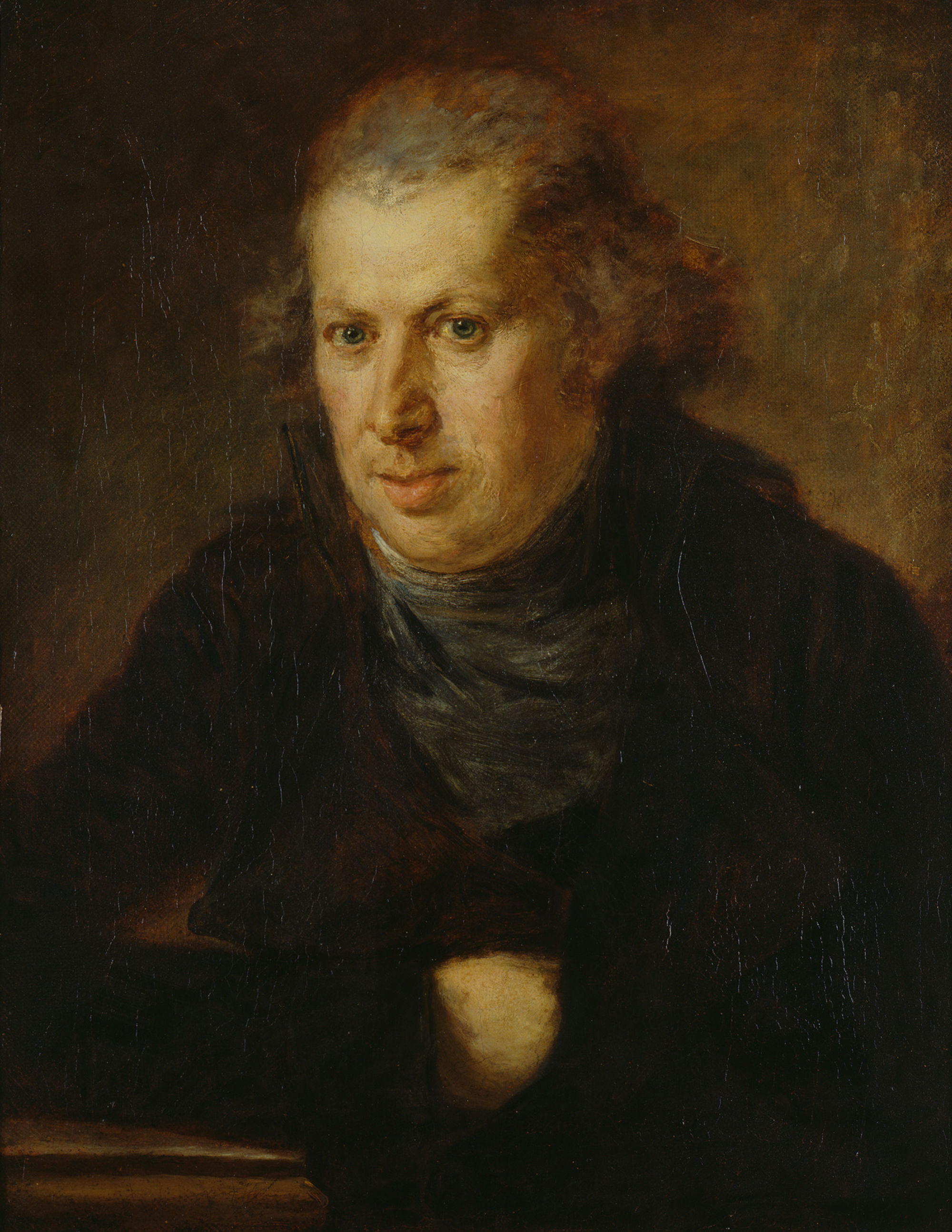
- Franz Xaver Kefer, about 1800, oil painting by Johann Georg Edlinger
- Born: 8 October 1763; Axöd
- Died: 11 September 1802 (aged 39); Munich
- Occupation: educator

Franz Xaver Kefer (1763 – 11 September 1802), was the founder and initiator of the holiday school in Munich, which became the model for all later vocational schools.

== Early life ==
The son of a court bailiff, Kefer was born in Axöd, then a hamlet, today a suburb of the city of Eggenfelden in Bavaria. At the age of 10, he attended as a pupil and a chorister the Benedictine Asbach monastery, dedicated to St Matthew, near Rotthalmünster. Three years later, he attended the teacher training seminary in the town of Landshut where through application he developed his musicality. Following this, he studied logic and physics at the Munich Lyceum (a non-degree institution for philosophical and theological studies attached to a grammar school).

== Educator and administrator ==
In October 1790, Kefer was employed as a supervisor and demonstrator of grammar, then arithmetic and penmanship at the Kurfürstlichen Militärakademie (Electoral Military Academy), which had been founded shortly before through Bavarian army reforms initiated by Benjamin Thompson in 1788; soon after he was appointed professor at the academy.

Initially without any financial support, but with electoral approval, Kefer founded a school on 18 August 1793 to train male trainees and journeymen in writing, reading and arithmetic in their free time alongside their professional work. It was housed in a room of Kefer's flat in what is now Sendlinger Strasse in Munich. Because of excessive demand, Kefer had to move to a larger flat, where two rooms were already used for the school, as early as January 1794. An assistant was also hired to teach at Kefer's expense. Lessons were held hourly in different classes. Two years after the school was founded, the first public final examination took place. Like all later events, it took place in Munich's old Town Hall in the presence of the electoral and municipal school commission. Kefer's school was merged in 1798 with the Holiday Drawing School, which his friend Hermann Mitterer had founded, to form the central Holiday School Munich. The institute received students from Germany and abroad. Its organizational and didactic concepts and reform models were essential precursors to today's vocational training.

In 1800, Kefer became a school inspector for other educational institutions, but continued to work intermittently as a teacher at the holiday school. School attendance was compulsory by law. Kefer's schools, since 1798, became post-secondary tertiary for apprentices who could not by then be released without a school leaving certificate. Through this the training monopoly of guilds was broken, and from then on training was supervised and standardized and by the state. Kefer's proposals for apprenticeship training were actively supported by king Maximilian I Joseph of Bavaria. In 1803, the public journeyman's examination was introduced by law in Bavaria.

In 1801, at Kefer's instigation, the Sonntags- und Ferienschule für Frauen (Female Sunday and Holiday School) was introduced to complement the Male Sunday and Holiday School, this to enable "citizen's daughters and female servants" to receive further education. In addition to reading, writing, arithmetic and Christian teaching, gender-specific housewife virtues were taught. The school gave education in practical skills to promote "domestic happiness". Unlike elementary schools, teachers were exclusively female.

Shortly before his death, for his services to education, he became the Churfürstlicher und städtischer deutscher Schulinspektor (Electoral and Municipal German School Inspector). Kefer created a Naturalienkabinett (Natural History Cabinet) for his schools to present types of wood and minerals for teaching purposes. He was also an author of schoolbooks.

== Death ==
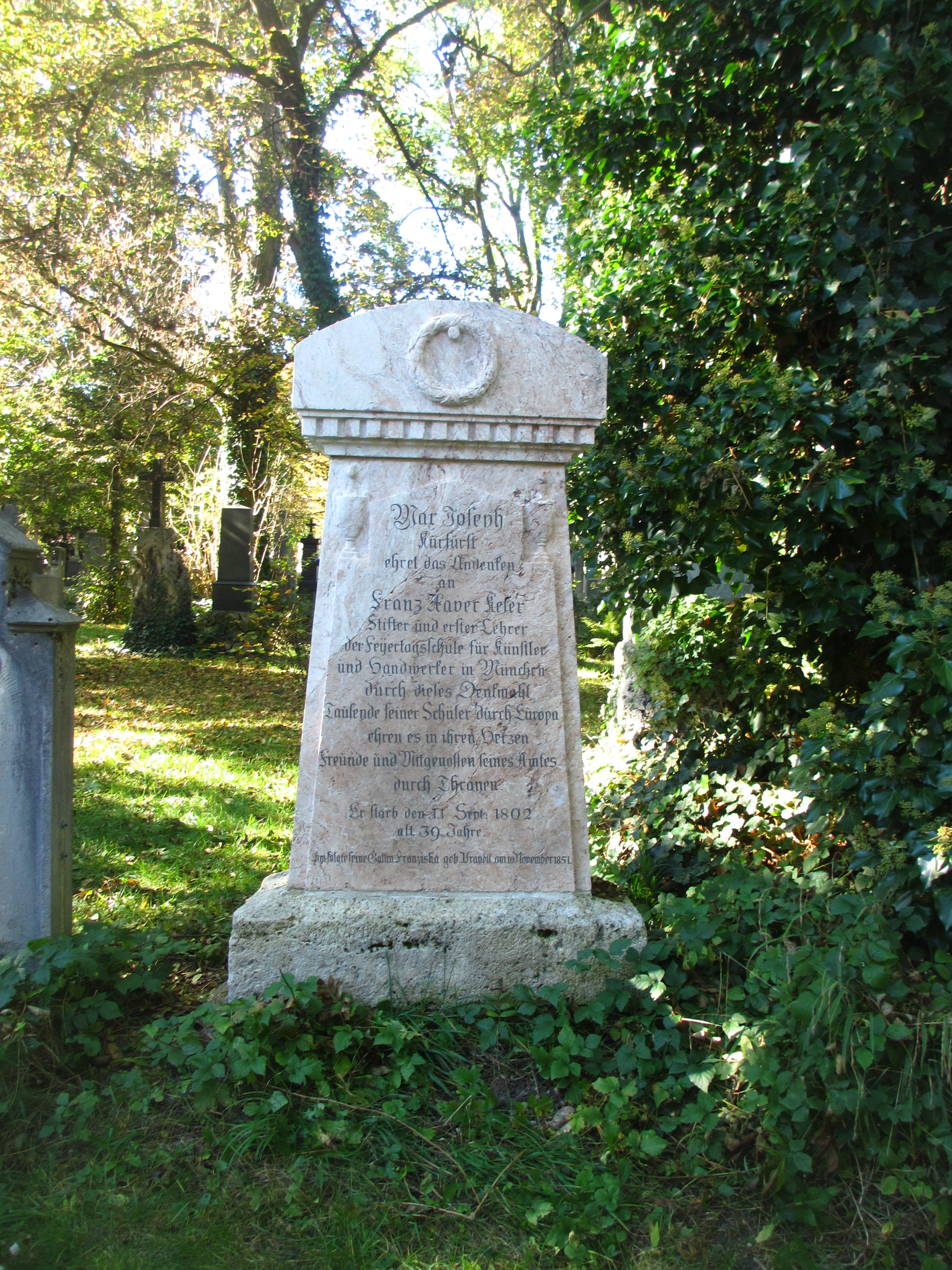
Franz Xaver Kefer's tomb opposite the tomb of his friend and fellow educator Hermann Mitterer.

Kefer was married for seven years to Franziska, née Brandtl. They had no children from this marriage. He died of a chest infection on 11 September 1802.

The Bavarian ruler Maximilian I Joseph donated his tomb in Munich's Old South Cemetery (Burial Ground 3 - Row 1 - Place 32), with the following inscription:

Max Joseph, Elector, honours the memory of Franz Xaver Kefer, founder and first teacher at the holiday school for artists and craftsmen in Munich with this monument. Thousands of his pupils throughout Europe honour it in their hearts, friends and colleagues of his office with tears. He died on 11 September 1802, aged 39. He was followed by his wife Franziska, née Brandtl on 10 November 1851.

Two reliefs on the monument could be reference to the 18-inch-high silver goblet award he had previously received in gratitude from masters and journeymen of the sword sweepers' and the cutlers' guilds in 1801.

== Further reading and sources ==
- Weichselbaumer, M.; Erste Dekade der Feiertagsschule (First Decade of Holiday School), 1793–1803
- Franz Xayer Kefer, Wie gut und nützlich es sey, dass die Schulen der Mädchen von jenen der Knaben abgesondert wurden (How good and useful it is that the girls' schools have been separated from the boys' schools.), Munich, 1802
- Holg, Johann Nepomuk; Die Handwerks-Gesellen und Männliche Central-Feiertagsschule in München (The Craftsmen's Journeymen and Men's Central Holiday School in Munich) Digitalisat, Munich, 1863
- Berg, Christa; Handbuch der deutschen Bildungsgeschichte (Handbook of the History of German Education), 1996
- Ehrlich, Horst; Die Kadettenanstalten, Strukturen und Ausgestaltung militärischer Pädagogik im Kurfürstentum Bayern im späteren 18. Jahrhundert (The Cadet Institutes, Structures and Design of Military Pedagogy in the Electorate of Bavaria in the Later 18th Century), Munich, 2007
