= Ameli Neureuther =

German fashion designer

Ameli Neureuther (born 15 June 1981 in Munich) is a German fashion designer. Her creations are characterised by a mixture of historical and modern style elements as well as the interplay of fashion, illustration and art.

== Family ==
Neureuther was born in the Munich district of Pasing as the first of two children of the two former ski racers Rosi Mittermaier and Christian Neureuther. Her brother is the former ski racer Felix Neureuther. Her great-great-grandfather was the painter Eugen Napoleon Neureuther (1806–1882), after whom, along with his brother, the architect Gottfried von Neureuther, the Neureutherstraße in Munich's Maxvorstadt district is named, her great-great-great-grandfather the painter Ludwig Neureuther (1774–1832).

Neureuther spent her childhood in Garmisch-Partenkirchen. Her son was born in February 2015.

== Education and career ==
From 1999 to 2001, Neureuther studied at the Cambridge School of Arts as part of an "Art Foundation Year". From 2001, she continued her training at the international fashion school Esmod in Munich. At that time, she went public with her outfit "Mixed expression" alongside the 160 other students at the fashion school. For a long time, she worked in New York for the fashion label Marc Jacobs, and for six years she worked in Berlin under Wolfgang Joop as a designer for the fashion label Wunderkind.

For the Alpine Ski World Championships 2011 in Garmisch-Partenkirchen, Neureuther designed the mascots Ga and Pa, two figures in the shape of a snowball.

In the meantime, she works as a freelance designer and illustrator.

== Awards ==
- November 2002 at the St.Katrin Festival in Munich: Prize of honour for the most elaborate opera costume
- March 2004 at the China Fashion Week in Beijing: 1st prize (endowed with €10,000) for illustration at the Hempel Fashion Award, one of the world's largest competitions for young designers

== Exhibitions ==
- 2002: Garmisch-Partenkirchen
