= St. Stephan's Church, Munich =

Church in Munich

St. Stephan's Church
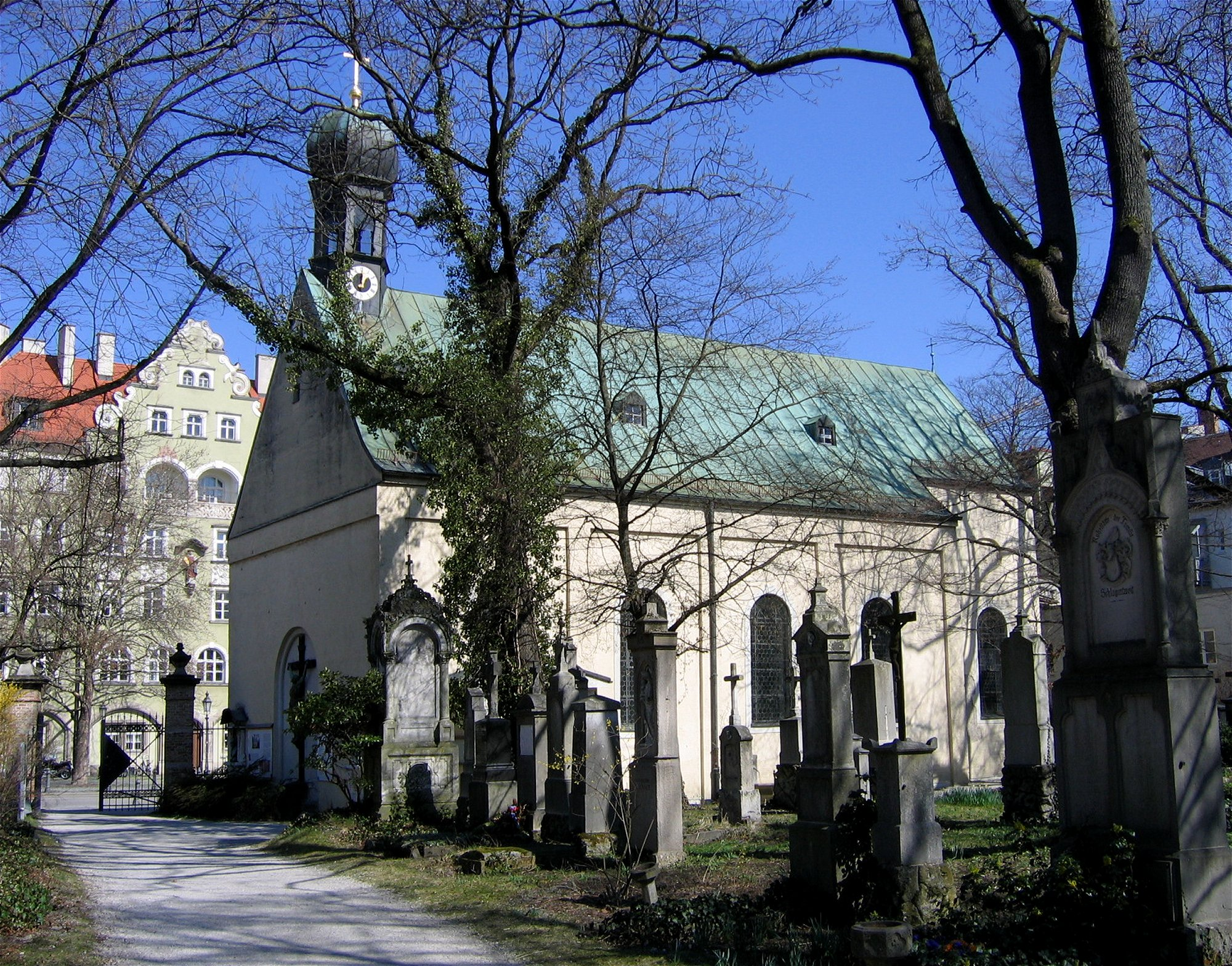
- St. Stephan's Church
- 48°07′51″N 11°34′00″E
- Address: Stephansplatz 2 Munich, Germany
- Country: Germany
- Denomination: Catholic

Architecture
- Architect: Georg Zwerger
- Style: Baroque
- Years built: 1674–1677

St. Stephan's Church is a former cemetery church of the old South Cemetery in Munich, Germany. It is the chapel of the parish church of St Peter.

St. Stephan's church is an early Baroque building, oriented eastwards, and constructed from 1674 to 1677 by Georg Zwerger.
