= Hermann Joseph Mitterer =

Hermann Mitterer, German art educator

Hermann Mitterer
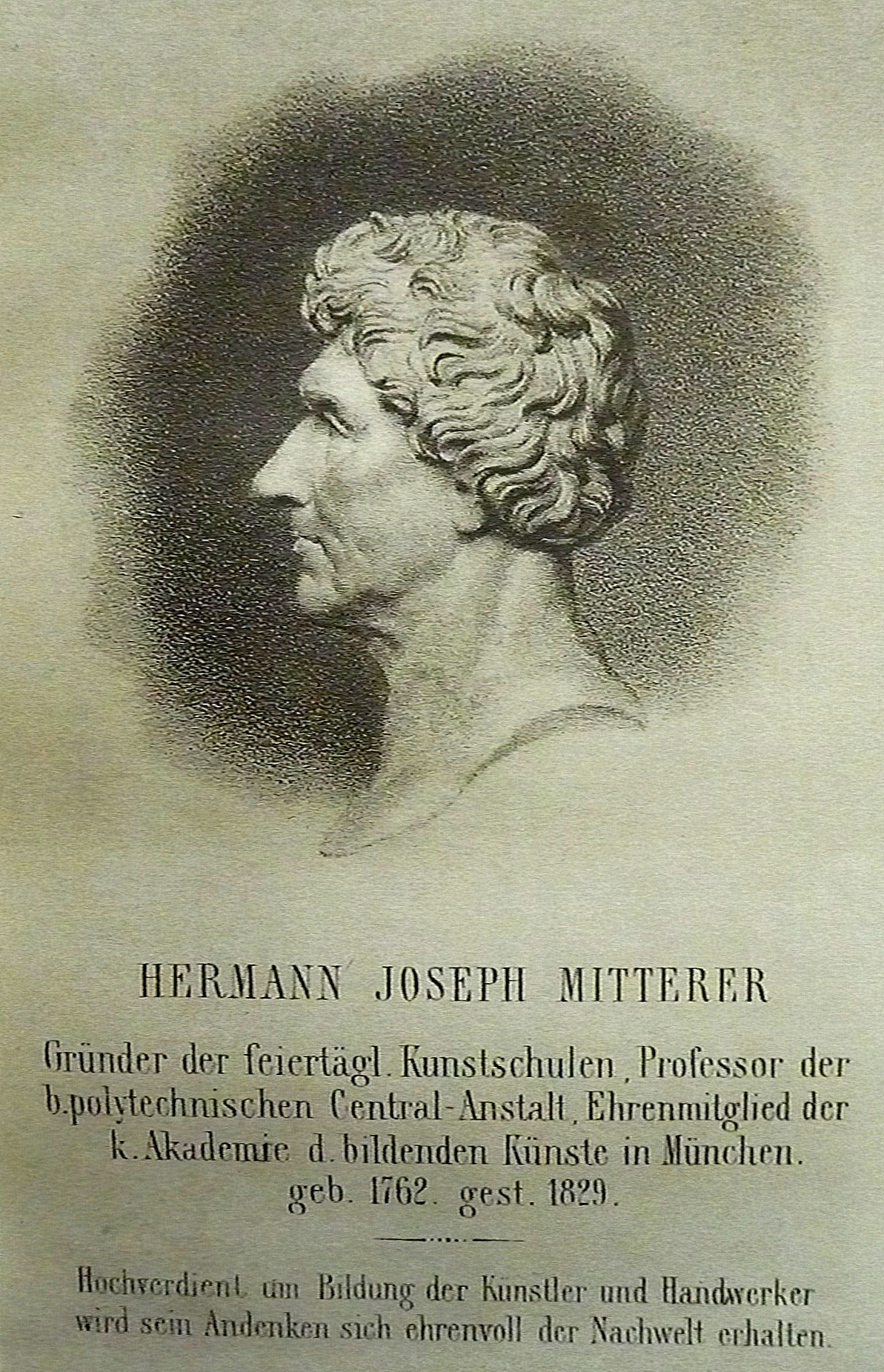
- Death portrait of Hermann Joseph Mitterer
- Born: Hermann Joseph Mitterer; 8 October 1762; Altenmarkt
- Died: 25 April 1829 (aged 66); Munich
- Occupation: art educator

Hermann Joseph Mitterer (8 October 1762,Altenmarkt, Osterhofen, Lower Bavaria – 25 April 1829, Munich), was a German drawing teacher, founder of Munich's Feiertägliche Zeichnungsschule (Holiday Drawing School) in 1792 and co-founder of Feiertagsschule München (Holiday School Munich) in 1793, forerunners of later vocational schools. On Mitterer's initiative, drawing lessons were made compulsory in all schools in Bavaria as early as 1789. He also founded the first Lithographische Kunstanstalt (Lithographic Art Institute).

Mitterer was an honorary member of the Academy of Fine Arts, Munich and was awarded the greater Medal of Honor by the City of Munich in 1797. Mittererstrasse, in Ludwigsvorstadt near München Hauptbahnhof (Munich Central Station), is named after him.

== Childhood and youth ==
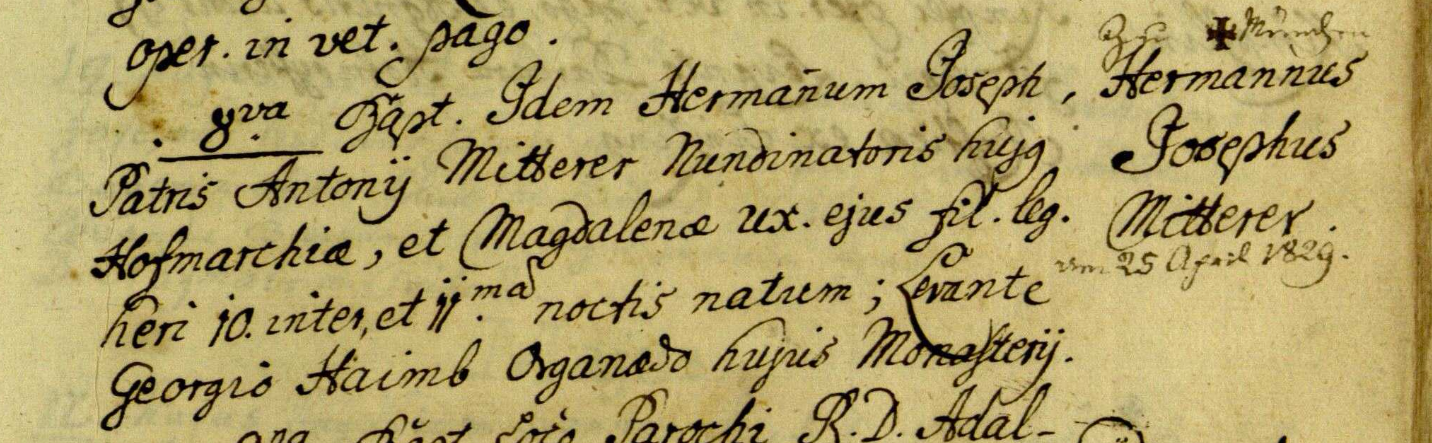
Birth entry for Hermann Mitterer in the church book of the monastery Altenmarkt near Osterhofen

Hermann Mitterer was the son of the baker and monastic grocer Anton Mitterer and his wife, Magdalena Krenn, in Altenmarkt (Old market), near Osterhofen Abbey. He initially attended Vornbach Abbey as a choirboy, then schooled at Passau, and finally at Munich where he graduated from grammar school in 1784 this after the death of both parents. Originally destined for theology, he became inclined towards mathematics and physics while in Passau where he also received drawing lessons. While in Munich attended the drawing academy of the Bavarian landscape painter Johann Jakob von Dorner.

== Drawing teacher and school founder ==
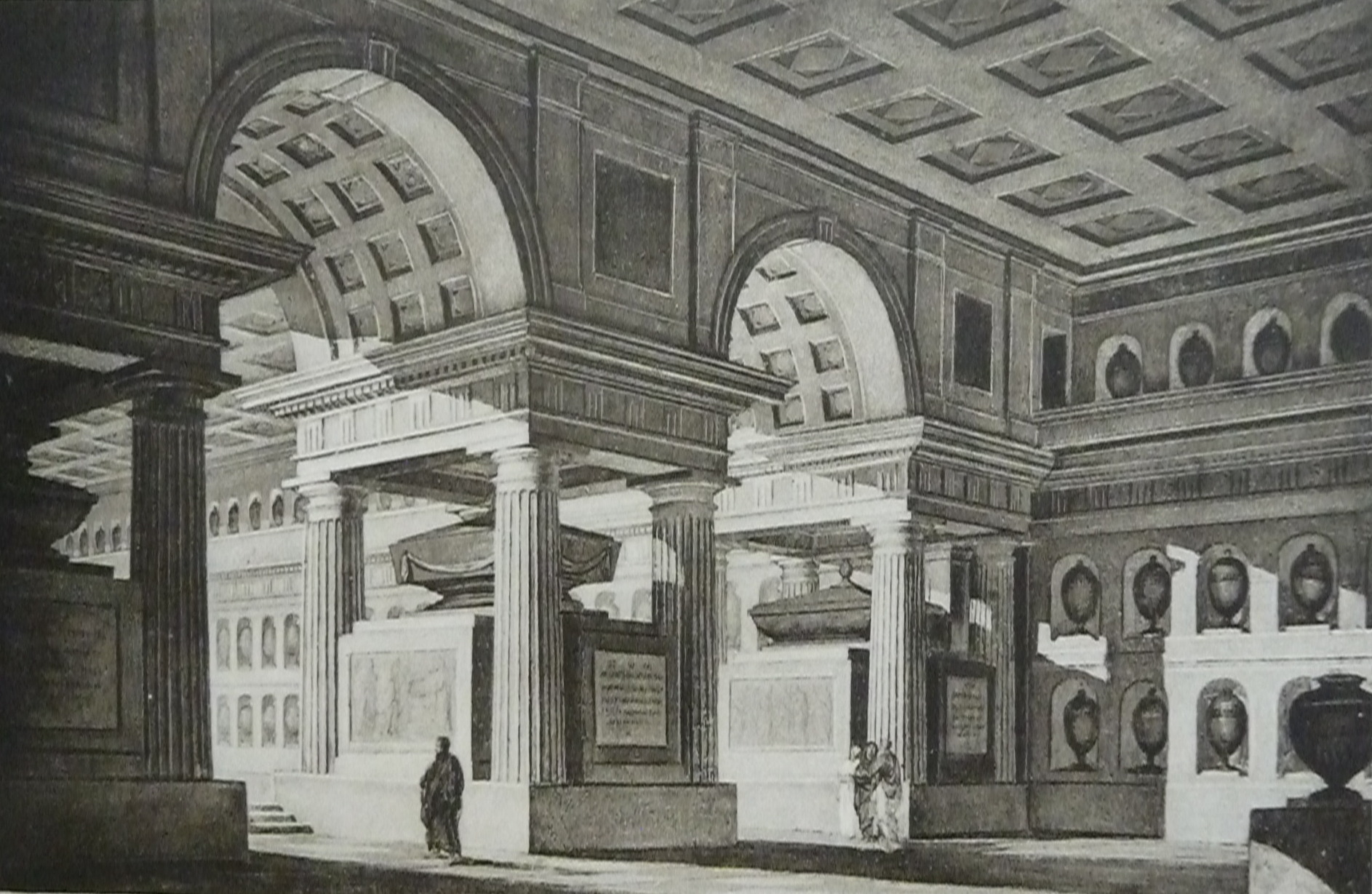
Original drawing by Herrmann Mitterer

From 1791 Mitterer worked as a grammar school drawing teacher in Munich and gave drawing lessons to journeymen, craftsmen and apprentices on a part-time basis. As he was convinced that the art of drawing was important for technical workers, he applied for a permit to establish an official school. This was granted on 26 March 1792 after which he set up a Holiday Drawing School. In 1793 another school for similar vocational training and further education was founded in Munich by Mitterer's friend Franz Xaver Kefer. Kefer's and Mitterer's schools were merged in 1798, which included artistic and technical drawing for artisans professionals. Mitterer also participated in the founding of the Baugewerksschule (Building Trades School) in Munich.

== Development of lithography ==
Mitterer's development in lithography created inexpensive templates for drawing lessons, which had previously only been available in the form of copperplate engravings that were five times as expensive. Until then lithography had only been used for printing sheet music and lettering. In 1798 Mitterer refined Alois Senefelder's lithographic process in the chemistry laboratory and mechanical workshop of the Feiertagsschule München, under support from the directorate and colleagues of the institute. With this improved technique, it was then possible to produce coloured printed matter with fine halftones.

Since a previous bar press was unfavourable for chalk printing, Mitterer, with the help of Alois Ramis, the teacher of practical mechanics at the Feiertagsschule, invented the roller or star press, which ensured uniform pressure and became the model for all later presses, whereby the stone lay on a movable base which is pulled through the press under a fixed roller.

== The Lithographic Art Institute ==
Mitterer became curator and Professor für Steingravierkunst (professor of stone engraving), at the Ersten lithographischen Kunstanstalt (Lithographic Art Institute) at Munich, and in 1815 became its administrator.

An important task of the institute was the production of suitable wall charts for schools. Printed also were templates for drawing lessons, a special concern of Mitterer. Thus, on Mitterer's initiative, drawing lessons became compulsory at all Bavarian elementary schools from 1798.

On 7 November 1804, the printers, publishers, and lithographers Theobald and Geog Senefelder, by contract for an annual fee of 700 guilders, sold their own lithographic process to Mitterer's Institute, this under an agreement that the process remained secret during the life of the contract. The Institute began its work in October 1805, and for a long time, Munich was regarded as the centre for the technical perfection of lithography. The commercial success of the process, which found sales beyond the borders of Germany, contributed significantly to the financial security of the institute. Senefelder objected to this commercialization of the process and in 1806 attempted to have the Institute closed down, however, he only succeeded in having Mitterer's privilege limited to the "production and publishing of such art articles" as related to pattern books and artists' lithographs for teaching purposes.

When, on 27 January 1808, the Ordinance on Land Surveying in Bavaria was published, the influential civil servant, administrator and entrepreneur for the development of Bavaria, Joseph von Utzschneider, insisted that maps be reproduced not by copperplate engraving but by lithography. This map series was produced under Mitterer's instruction and assistance.

== Published lithographic illustrations ==
- 1797 – Poisonous Plants for Schools
- 1804 – Anfangsgründe der Figurenzeichnung in Handzeichnungsmanier zur Selbsterlernung (Initial principles of figure drawing in hand drawing manner for self-learning')
- 1805-1807 - under Lithographic Art Products including flowers, figures, portraits, after masters in the hand-drawn manner by significant Munich artists
- 1820 – Anleitung zur Hydraulik für praktische Künstler und Werkmeister mit vorzüglicher Hinsicht auf das Brunnenwesen (Instructions on hydraulics for practical artists and master craftsmen with special reference to fountains). Verlag der Feyertags-Schule München (Publishing House of the Feyertags School Munich)
- 1822 – Anleitung zur Mechanik für praktische Künstler und Werkmeister mit vorzüglicher Hinsicht auf den Mühlenbau (Instruction in mechanics for practical artists and master craftsmen with special reference to mill construction). Verlag der Feyertags-Schule München.
- 1824-1826 – Anleitung zur bürgerlichen Baukunst und Bauzeichnung mit den nöthigsten Grundsätzen begleitet (Guide to Civil Architecture and Architectural Drawing Accompanied by the Most Necessary Principles). Verlag der Feyertags-Schule München.
- 1825 – Die deutsche Zimmerwerks-Kunst als Fortsetzung der bürgerlichen Baukunst und Bauzeichnung (The German Carpentry Art as a Continuation of Bourgeois Architecture and Architectural Drawing). Verlag der Feyertags-Schule München.

== Sources and further reading ==
- Holland, Hyacinth; Mitterer, Hermann Joseph in Allgemeine Deutsche Biographie (ADB), Volume 22, Duncker & Humblot, Leipzig 1885, pp. 23–25
- Menges, Franz; Mitterer, Hermann Joseph in New German Biography (NDB), Volume 17, Duncker & Humblot, Berlin 1994, p. 582. ISBN 3428001982
- Wurst, Jurgen; "Hermann Josef Mitterer" in Wurst, Jürgen and Langheiter, Alexander (ed.), Monachia, Städtische Galerie im Lenbachhaus, Munich 2005, p. 170 ISBN 3886451569
- Ferchl, Franz Maria; History of the establishment of the first lithographic art institute at the holiday school for artists and technicians in Munich, Munich, 1862
- Conversation lexicon, or Concise Encyclopedic Dictionary for the Educated Estates, 1816
- Holg, Johann Nepomuk; Die Handwerks-Gesellen and Männliche Central Holiday School in Munich, Munich, 1863
- Weichselbaumer, M.; First Decade of Holiday School, 1793–1803
- "Mitterer, Hermann Joseph" in Deutsche Biographische Enzyklopädie Online, Rudolf Vierhaus (ed.)
