= Eugen Napoleon Neureuther =

German painter

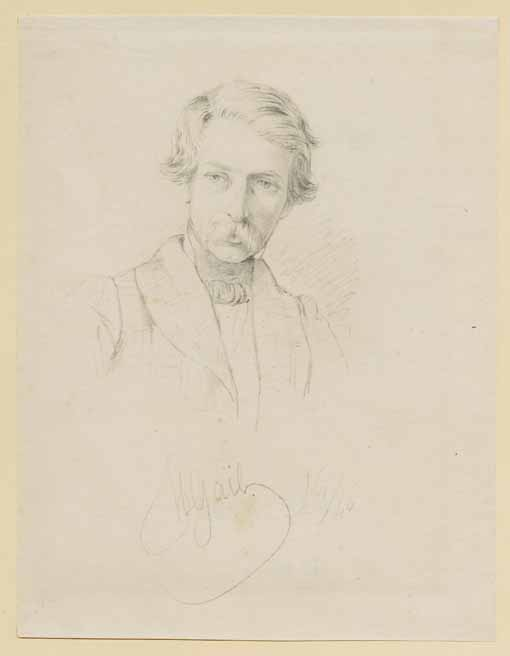
Eugen Napoleon Neureuther. Drawing by Wilhelm Gail, ca. 1850

Eugen Napoleon Neureuther (13 January 1806 – 23 March 1882) was a German painter, etcher, and illustrator.

Born in Munich, Germany, he was the son and pupil of the painter Ludwig Neureuther (1775–1830). He also studied at the Munich Academy under Wilhelm von Kobell (1766–1855). His talent developed, however under the influence of Cornelius, who employed him on the frescoes in the Glyptothek and in the Königsbau. His illustrations for Goethe's romances and ballads with marginal drawings, published in 1829–39, made his reputation.

In 1830 Neureuther visited Paris, where his illustrations of the scenes of the July revolution appeared under the title Souvenir du 27, 28, 29 juillet (1831). After his return he published Marginal Drawings to Bavarian Poets (1832–35), and in 1838 completed his illustrations to Herder's Cid. His best etching is perhaps the large plate of Dornröschen (1839). As a painter, he may be judged by The Pastor's Daughter of Taubenhain, in the Pinakothek, Munich, and six canvases in the Schack Gallery at Munich. All his work is distinguished by great decorative charm and by purity and nobility of line. He is buried in the Alter Südfriedhof in Munich.
