= Gustav Vorherr =

German architect

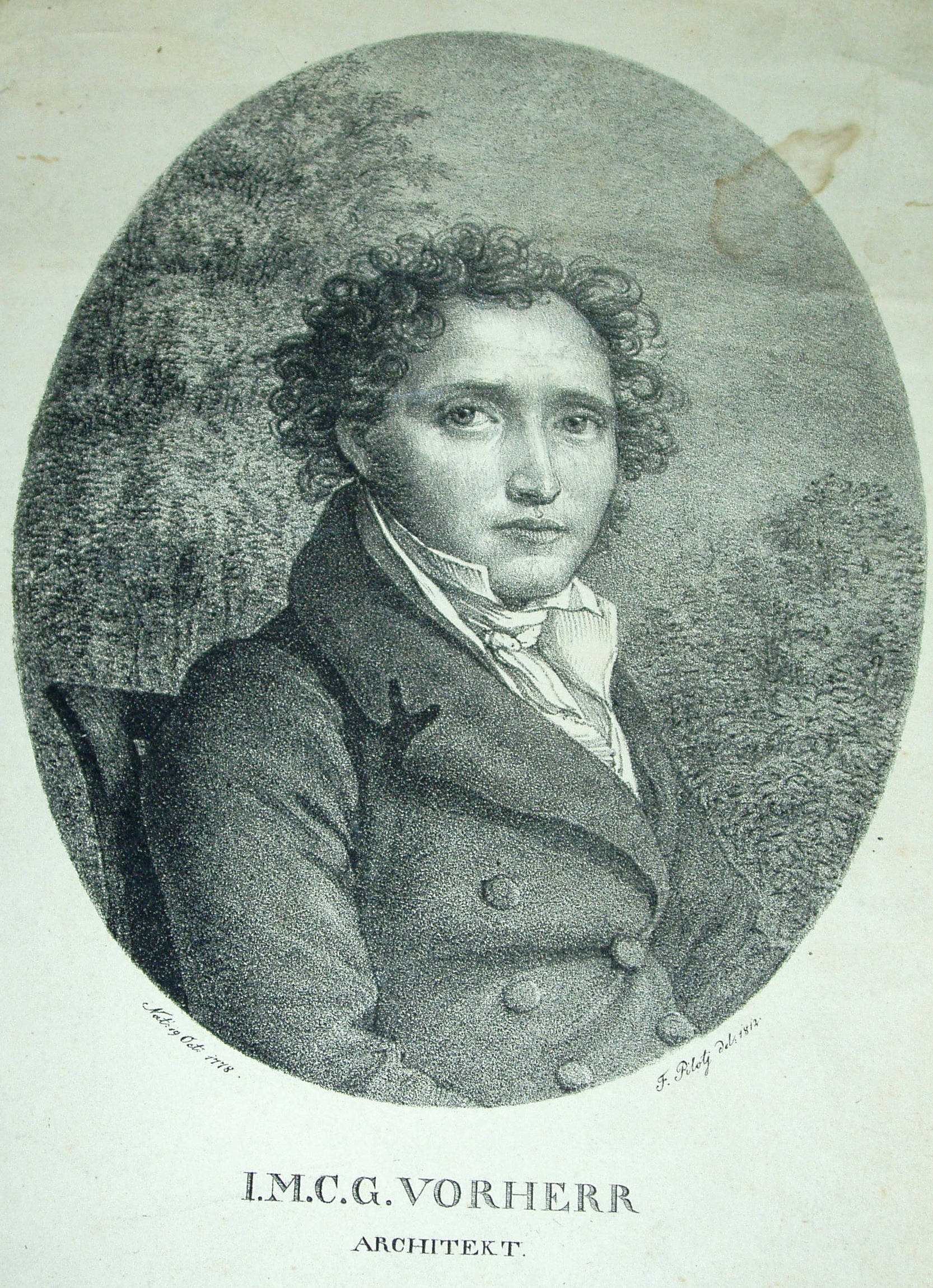

Gustav Vorherr, full name Johann Michael Christian Gustav Vorherr (19 October 1778 - 1 October 1847) was a German architect and publicist. In addition, he was the chief construction officer of the young Kingdom of Bavaria. He officiated a. as board member of the Royal Building Trade School in Munich, campaigned for the "protection of antiquities" as early as the 1820s and was thus a pioneer in the preservation of historical monumentsin Bavaria. As chairman of the Bavarian State Beautification Association he founded, he pioneered the competition "Unser Dorf hat Zukunft", which is still taking place today. As a publicist for the monthly newspaper for construction and state beautification in Bavaria, he provided sustainable models for public buildings throughout Bavaria.
