= National symbols of Slovakia =

National symbols of Slovakia are the flag of Slovakia, the coat of arms of Slovakia, the national seal of Slovakia and the Slovak anthem. These are protected by law and have restrictions on their use and reproduction.

Coat of arms of Slovak Republic

Flag of the Slovak Republic

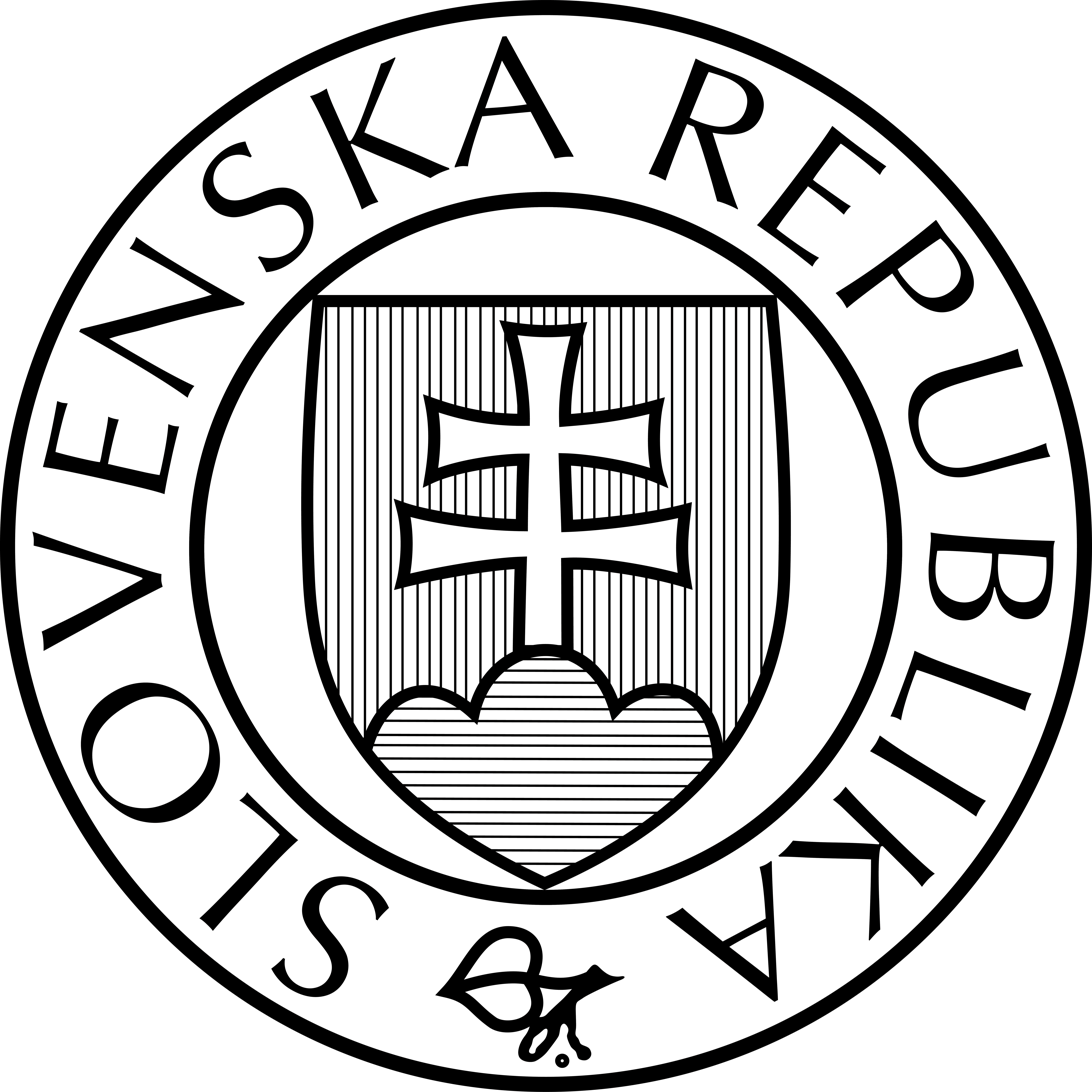
National Seal of Slovakia

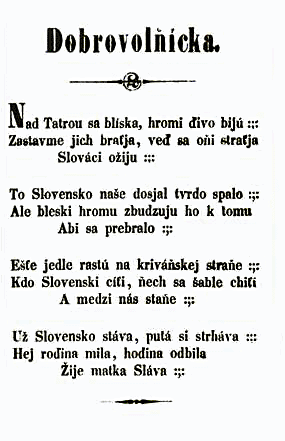
Slovak National Anthem

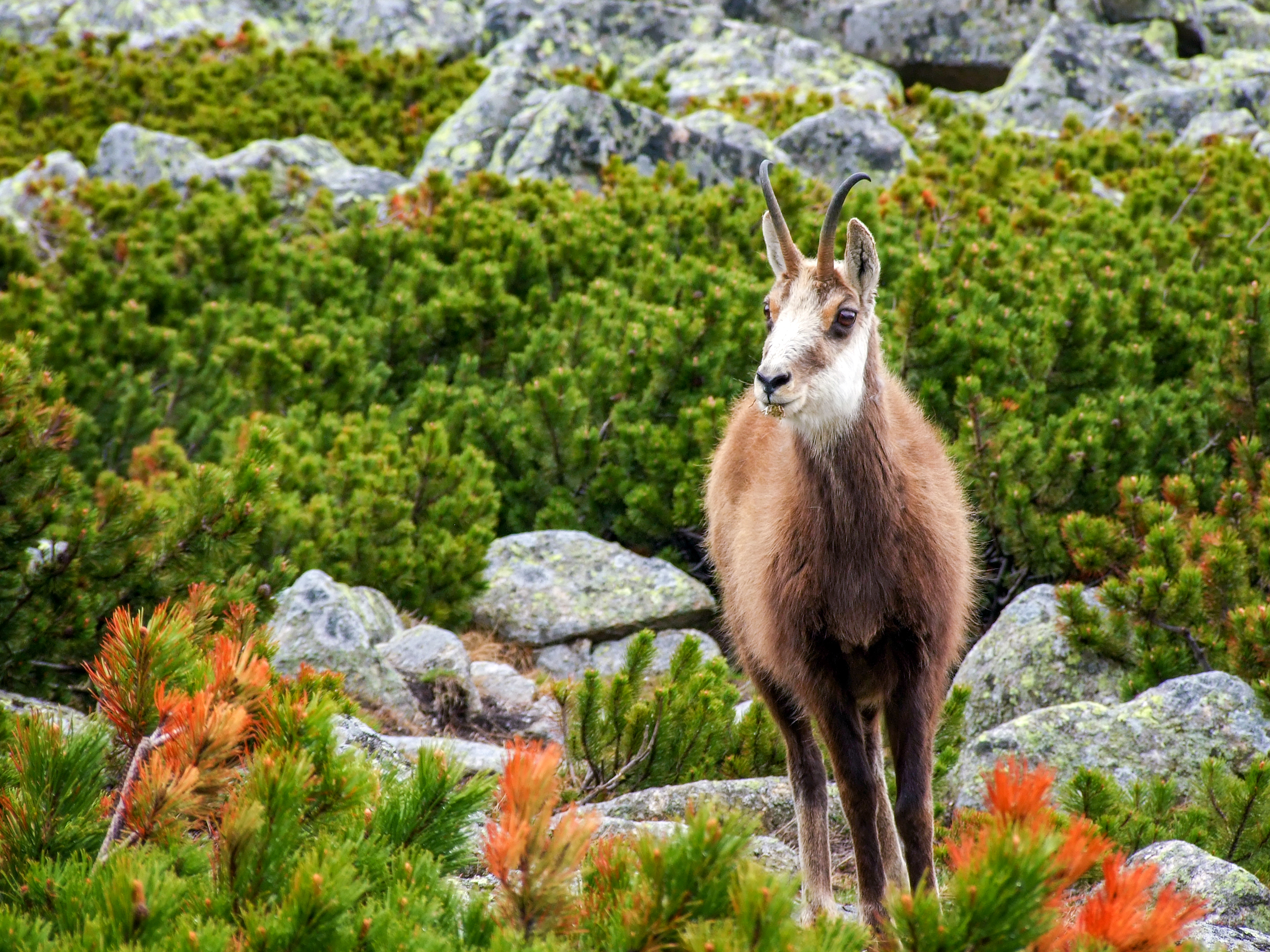
National Animal
