= Mount (heraldry) =

In heraldry, a mount (also mountain, hill, hillock) is a representation of a hill or mountain as a curved terrace in base. When the mount is included in the lower part of the shield, it may be considered an ordinary rather than a charge.

A trimount, also called a mount mounted, shapournet shapourned, or (in German) Dreiberg, is a representation of a mount with three tops. The trimount can be found throughout heraldic traditions (Gallo-British, German-Nordic, and Latin), but it is especially common in Switzerland.

A design of six hills (Sechsberg) can also be found in Swiss and Italian heraldry. For mounts with more than three tops, the number of tops is blazoned as coupeaux, e.g. German Sechsberg would be a mount of six coupeaux, and German Zehnberg as a mount of ten coupeaux. A mount with more than six tops can also be blazoned as Schroffen in German heraldry. In medieval German heraldry, mounts could have more than ten peaks.

== Terrace in base curved ==
A terrace in base curved is blazoned mount, hill, or hillock when represented in vert; sometimes as a mount vert for clarity. A terrace in base curved may occasionally be blazoned as mount even when not tinctured vert; this is mostly found in cases where the base represents a hill for one or several of the charges in the coat of arms. Classification of a mount as either an ordinary or a charge, is, in many cases, a matter of interpretation.

Alsóregmec

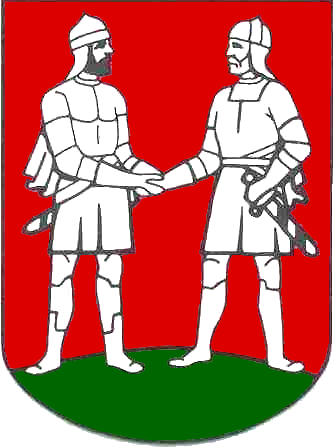
Bünde

Montanaire

Altafulla (Or, a mount gules surmounted by a leaf vert)

== Double mount ==
Egerkingen

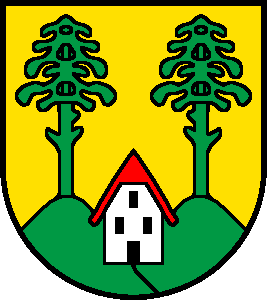
Fehren

== Trimount ==
The coats of arms of Hungary and Slovakia depict a trimount with a double cross, first used in the seal of Stephen V of Hungary (r. 1270–1272). At first, it was only a small element at the bottom of the coat of arms, later it became a regular heraldic figure. Originally it represented biblical Golgotha. Modern day Slovak interpretation is that it represents three mountain ranges of the Kingdom of Hungary: the Tatra, Fatra, and Mátra.

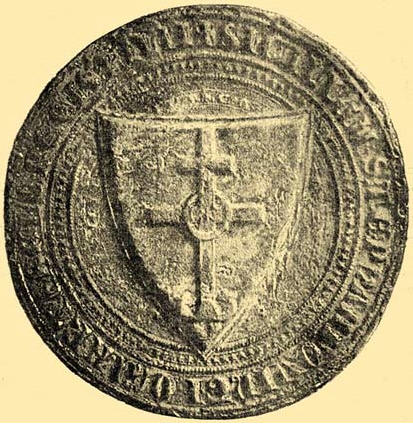
Seal of Stephen V of Hungary (c. 1270), coat of arms of Hungary

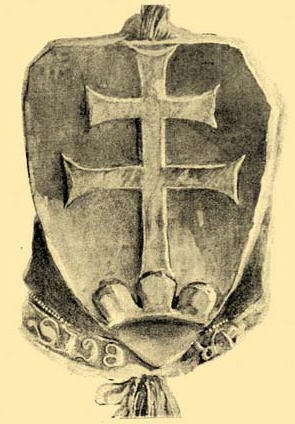
Seal of Wenceslaus III of Bohemia (c. 1301), coat of arms of Slovakia

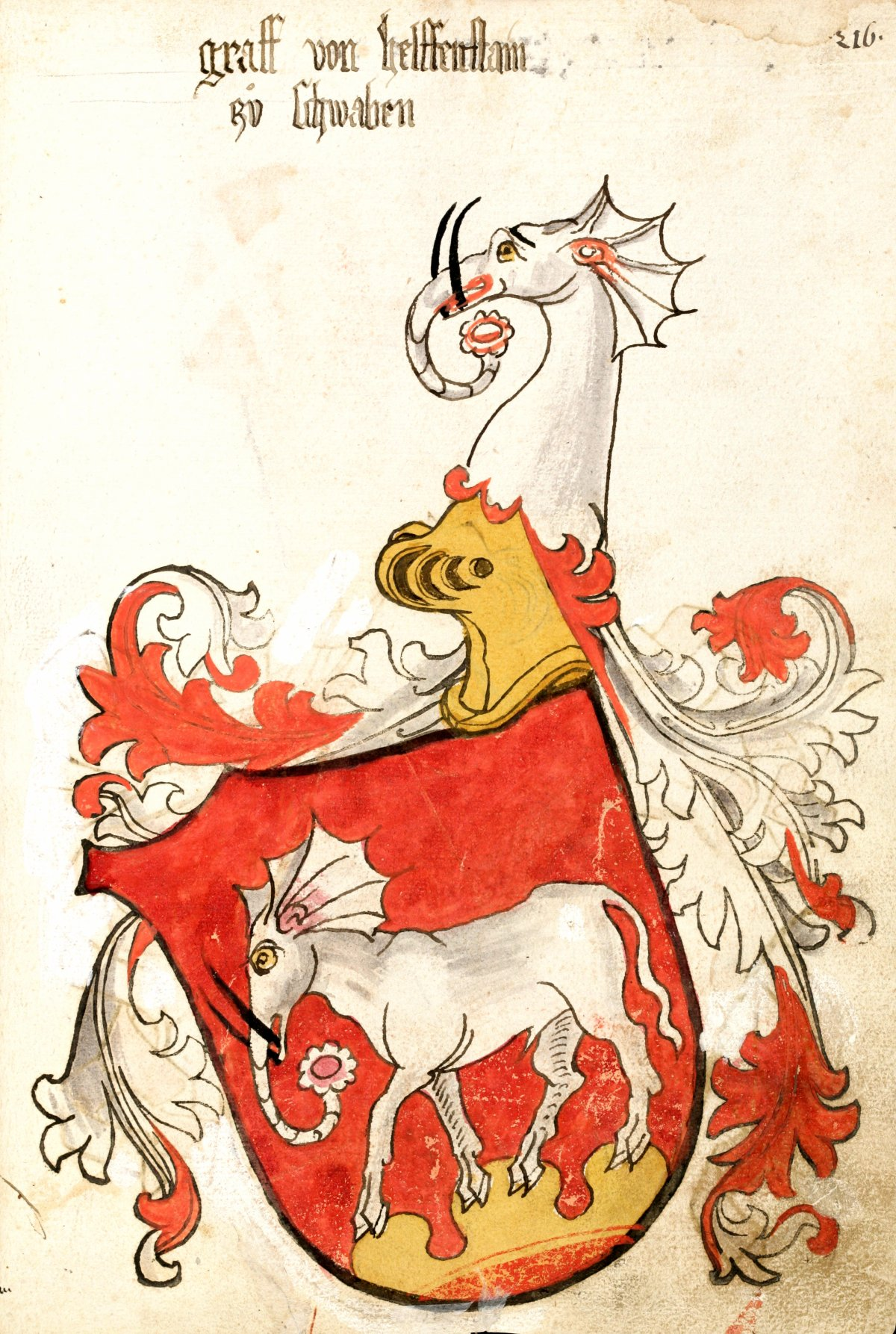
Helfenstein (Rösch armorial)

Hennenberg (Zurich armorial)

Bergisch Neukirchen

Ebersberg

The representation of three pointed mountains (not a heraldic trimount) in the 1991 coat of arms of Slovenia symbolises Triglav, the highest mountain in Slovenia.

== Mount of four coupeaux ==
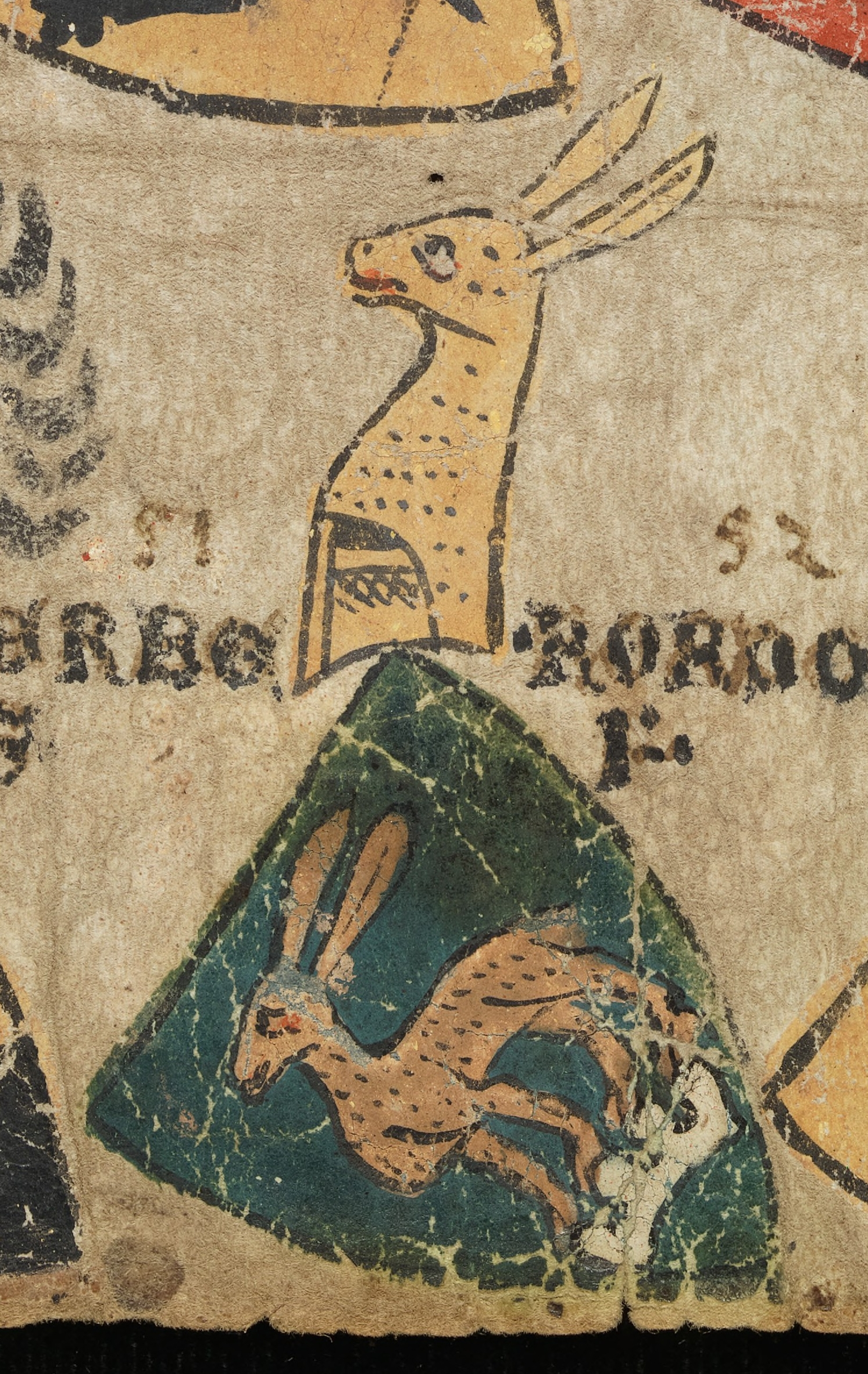
Zurich armorial

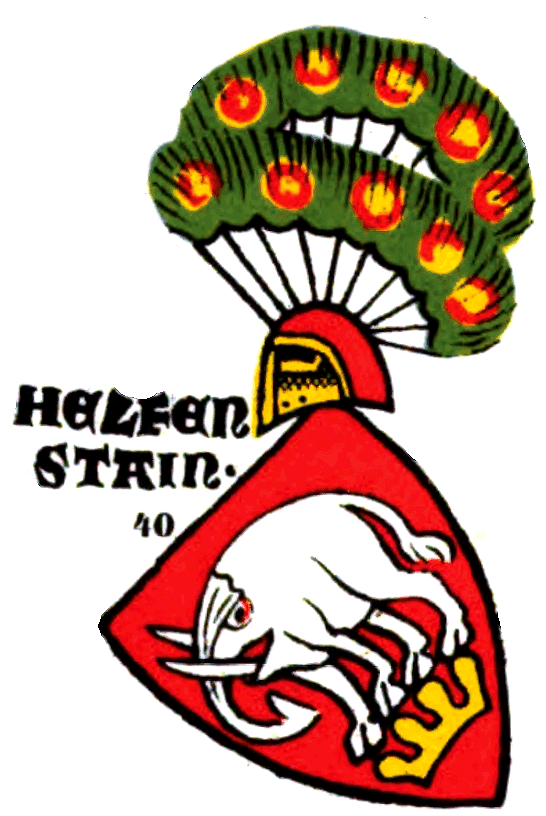
Helfenstein (Zurich armorial)

Vaihingen an der Enz

== Mount of five coupeaux ==
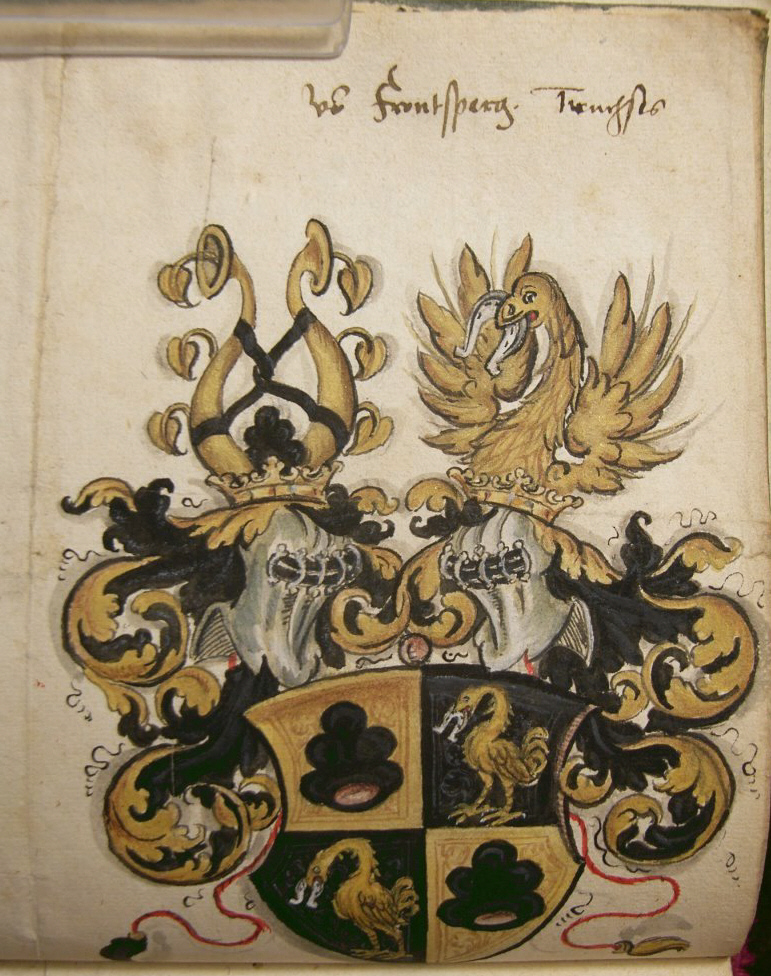
Freundsberg (Frontsperg, Frundsberg), 16th century

Birgland

Rebévelier

Wiesensteig

== Mount of six coupeaux ==
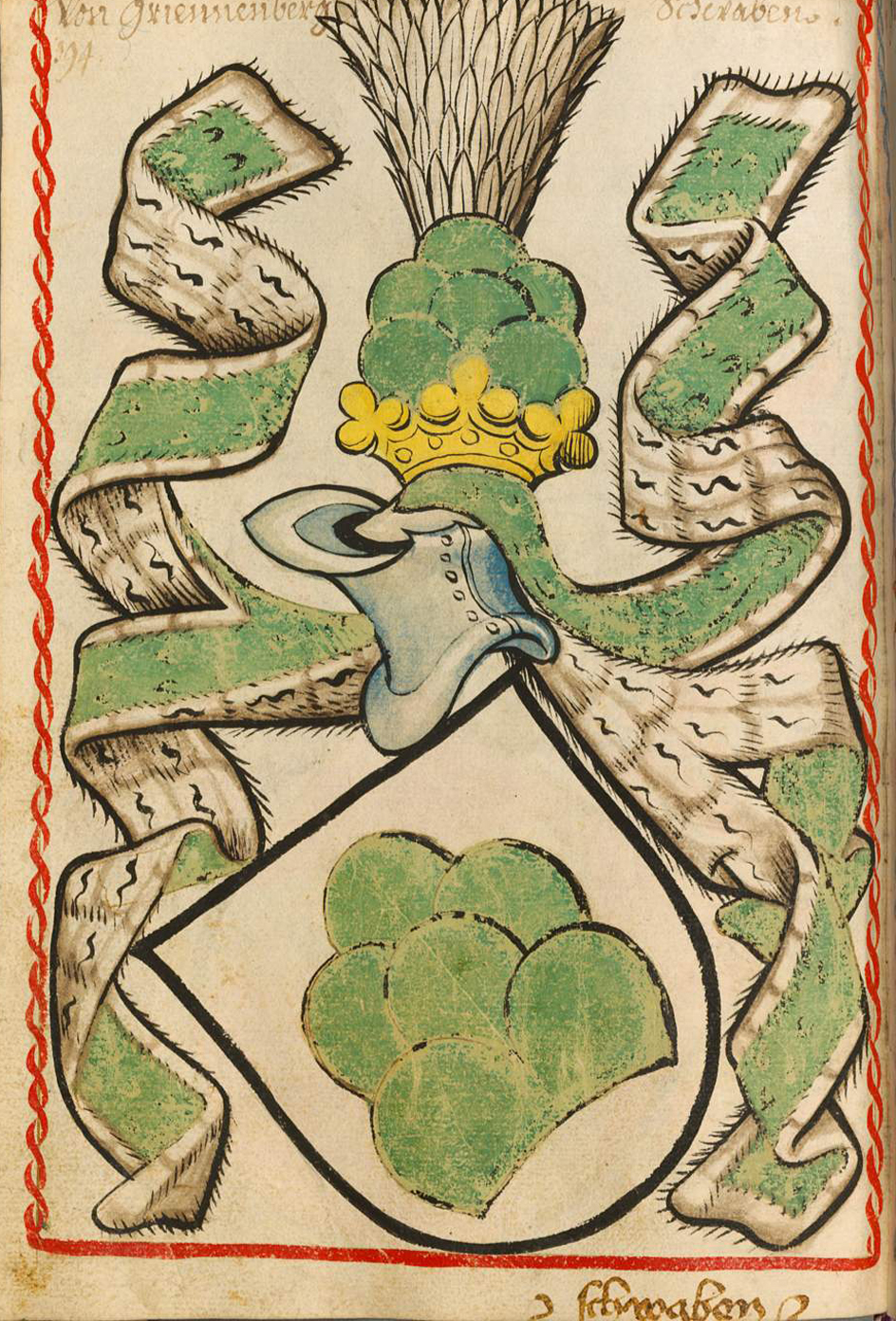
Grünenberg (15th century)

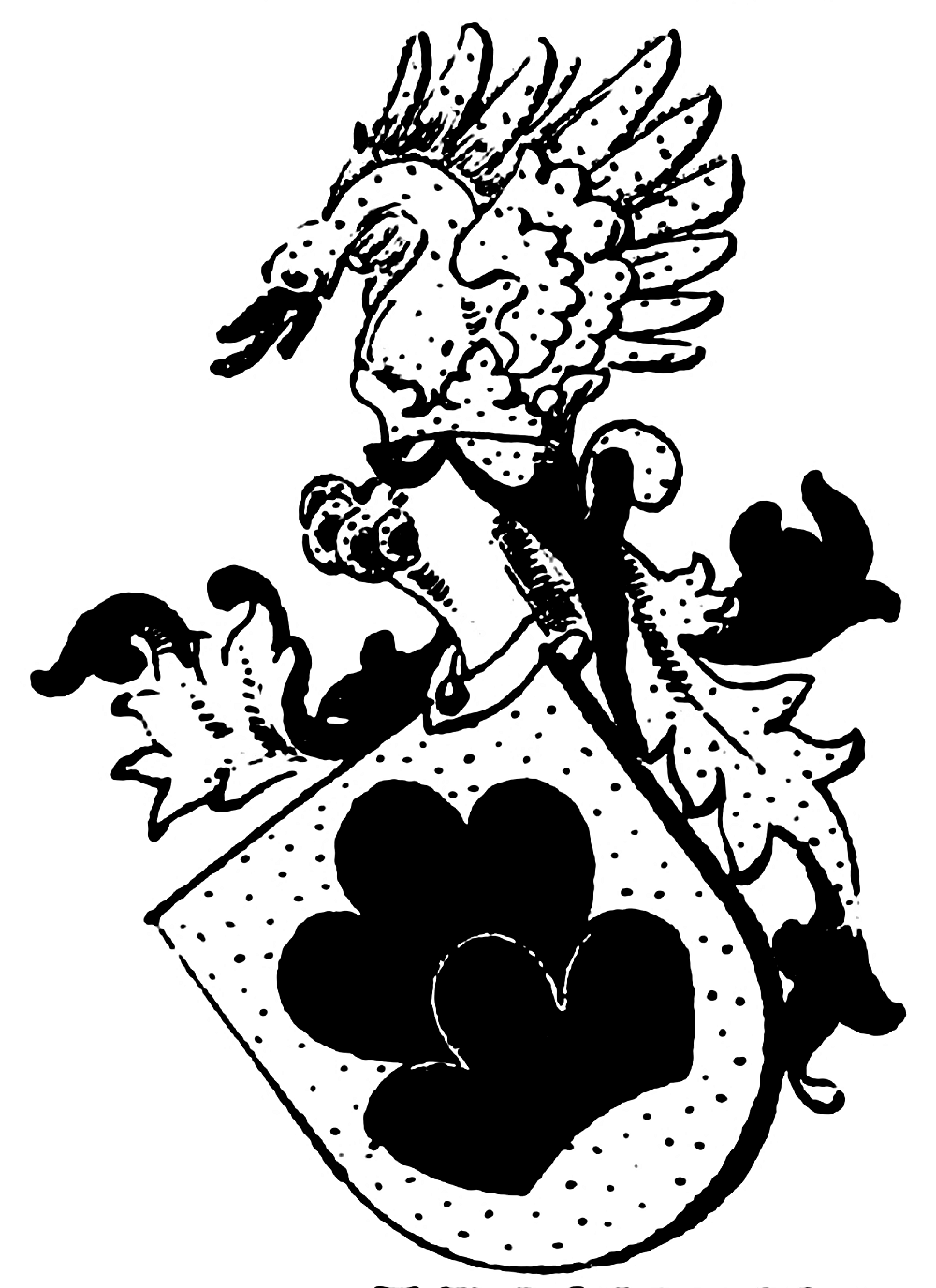
Freundsberg (Fronsberg, Frundsberg)

Delémont

Fichtenberg

Gleichamberg

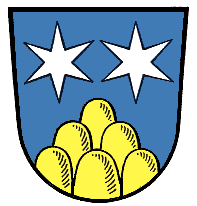
Mahlberg

Regensberg

== Mount of seven coupeaux ==
Cosenza

== Mount of ten coupeaux ==
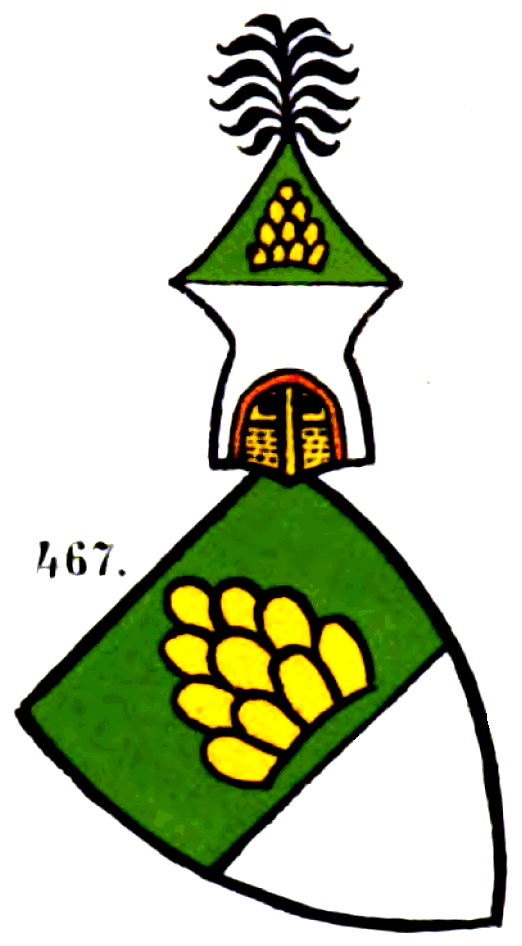
Grünenberg (Zürich armorial)

== Mount of twelve coupeaux ==
Saint-Cyr-au-Mont-d'Or
