= Coat of arms of Slovakia =

Coat of arms of the Slovak Republic
- Armiger: Slovak Republic
- Adopted: 1 March 1990 (13 June 1919)
- Shield: Gules, a mount of three peaks Azure, issuant therefrom a double cross Argent

The coat of arms of the Slovak Republic consists of a red (gules) shield, in early Gothic style, charged with a silver (argent) double cross standing on the middle peak of a dark blue mountain consisting of three peaks. Extremities of the cross are amplified, and its ends are concaved. The double cross is a symbol of its Christian faith, and the hills represent three symbolic mountain ranges: Tatra, Fatra (made up of the Veľká Fatra and Malá Fatra ranges), and Matra (in Hungary).

The genesis and history of the iconography and symbolism of the state emblem of the Slovak Republic has three basic development periods and all three organically follow each other: Byzantine (6th-12th centuries), Hungarian (12th-20th centuries) and Slovak (19th-20th centuries).

== Modern design history ==
In 1990, the Slovak Interior Ministry tasked Ladislav Čisárik (a painter and heraldic artist) and Ladislav Vrtel (an expert in heraldry) with creating a new coat of arms and national flag in the aftermath of the Velvet Revolution. Čisárik and Vrtel based their artistic designs for a modern coat of arms and flag on an existing 14th century Hungarian coat of arms, it was based on the seal of King Louis I of Hungary. However, Čisárik and Vrtel chose to enlarge the hills three times, because it was considered a significant and meaningful symbol. In addition to the national coat of arms and the national flag, the duo also designed a new presidential standard, which incorporates the same design as well.

== Double cross ==
One of the modern interpretations of the double cross is that it represents Slovakia as an heir and guardian of Christian tradition.

In Slovakia, there is a coded myth that the double cross was brought to the region by St. Cyril and St. Methodius, two missionaries from the Byzantine Empire. This legend, which is generally accepted today, arose only in the period of romanticism, accompanying the process of national awareness of the Slovaks in the middle of 19th century. So far, no archaeological finds have confirmed the presence of a double cross in Central Europe during the Great Moravian period or the immediately following period. The oldest double cross in present-day Slovakia dates back to the 11th century. Moreover the exception of depictions on Byzantine coins, the double cross did not appear anywhere in mural iconography, in plastic form, or as a solitary object before the middle of the 10th century. According to Slovak archeologist Titus Kolník, the double cross legend of Cyril and Methodius is a fiction: "that myths have more power than history".

There are also attempts to validate the legend of the double cross associated with Cyril and Methodius, as well as to explore its potential mediating role through the supposed appearance of the double cross on early coins from the Hungarian royal Árpad dynasty (King Saint Stephen of Hungary (997–1038), King Béla I of Hungary (1060–1063)) to the depiction of the real double cross on the coins of King Béla III of Hungary (1172–1196)). The merging of the "cross" from the central field with the division sign - with the real cross in the colophon of the coin is completely accidental and cannot be considered a double cross. That is an iconographic misunderstanding, a simple misinterpretation of two normal crosses.

The double cross, a symbol of royal power, appeared only during the reign of King Béla III of Hungary (1172–1196). Daughter of King Saint Ladislaus I Hungary, Saint Irene was a Byzantine empress, she was the mother of the Byzantine Emperor Manuel I Komnenos. The second son of King Géza II of Hungary, Béla arrived in Constantinople in 1163. Béla was raised in the imperial court of Manuel due to the close Byzantine-Hungarian relations of the mid-12th century, and he was even the heir to the throne. He had ambitions to create a Hungarian–Byzantine personal union. In 1169, Manuel's young wife gave birth to a son, thus depriving Béla of his status as heir of the Byzantine throne. The most intensive contacts between the Hungarian royal court and the Constantinople imperial court were under Béla III. It was during this time that Béla III brought with him the double cross as a royal emblem, which appeared for the first time on his coat of arms and minted coins.

On the coins and seals of King Béla IV of Hungary (1235–1270), the double-cross shield reappears.

After the extinction of the male branch of the Árpád dynasty in 1301, the Hungarian Anjou kings (King Charles I of Hungary (1308–1342), King Louis I of Hungary (1342–1382) combined the Árpád dynasty's striped shield with their own lily coat of arms. By using the striped shield, the Anjous indicated their connection to the Árpád dynasty through a female line. On the reverse side of their seal, they engraved the double cross, which symbolized the Kingdom of Hungary.

Since 1526, when the Habsburgs became kings of the Kingdom of Hungary, the current "combined" coat of arms of Hungary including the double cross symbol and the stripes symbol was used as the symbol of the Kingdom of Hungary (except that the small crown below the double cross was added only in the 17th century).

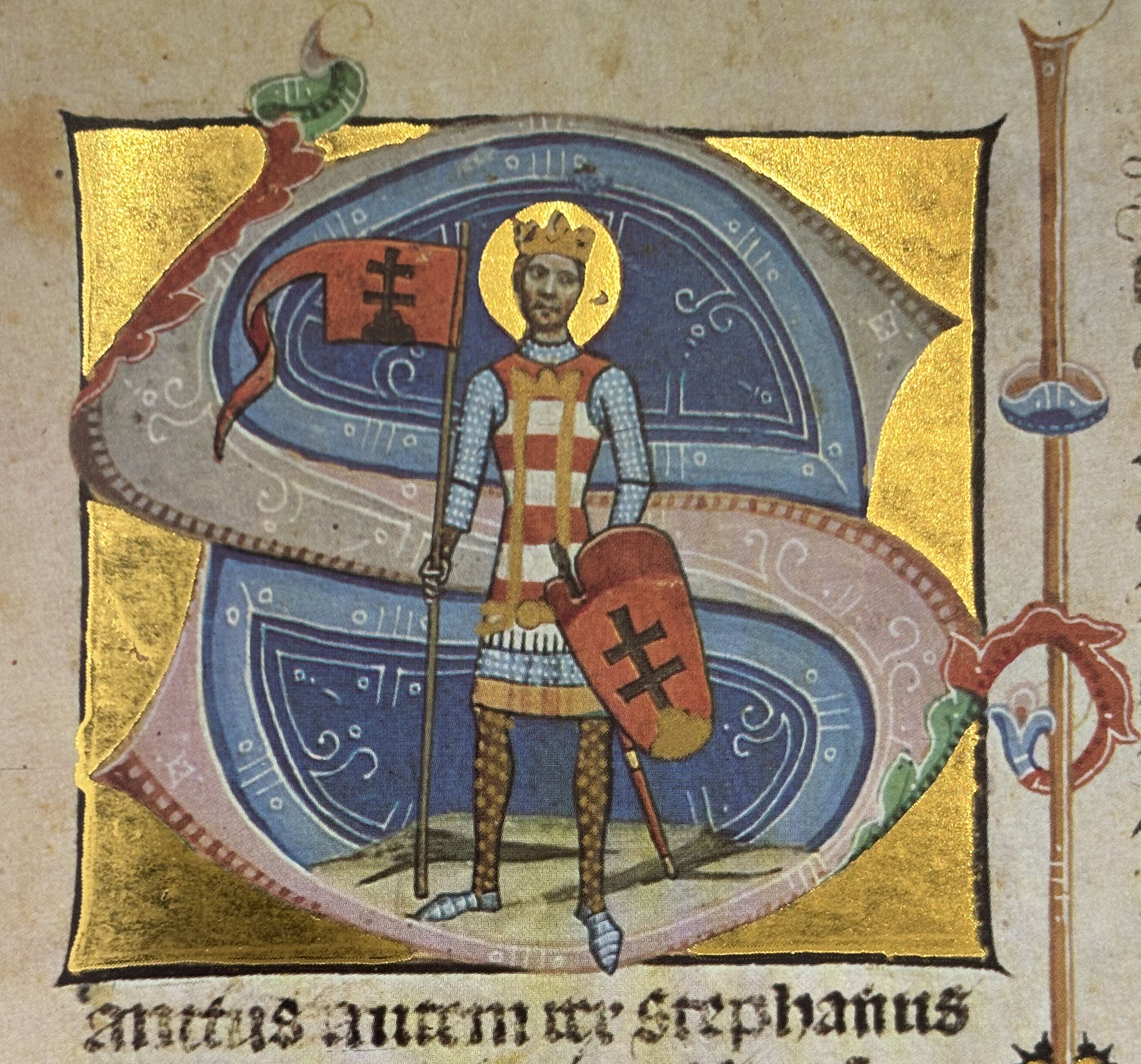
Saint Stephen (1000–1038), the first King of Hungary depicted in the Chronicon Pictum (1358)

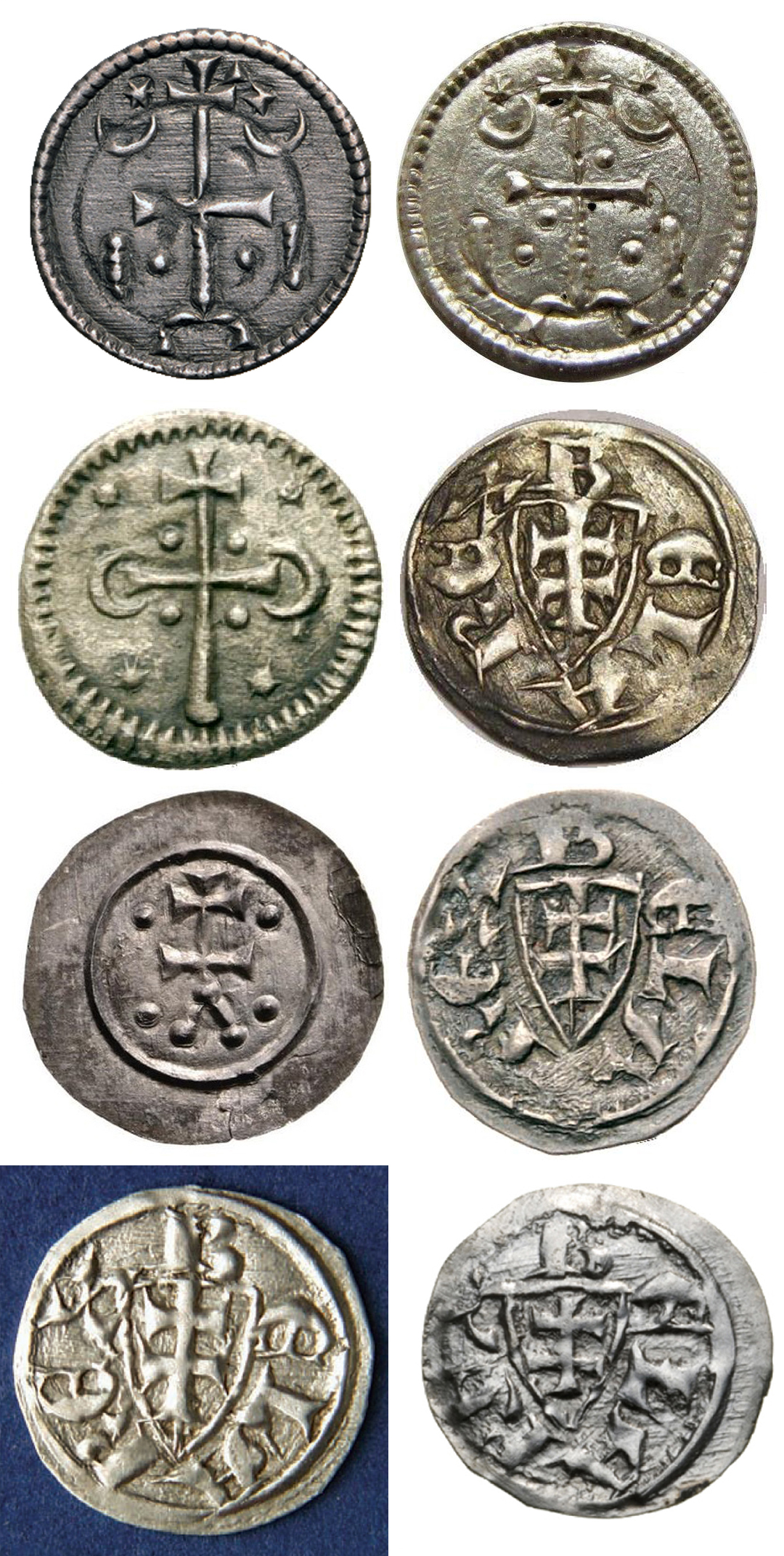
Coins of King Béla III of Hungary with double cross

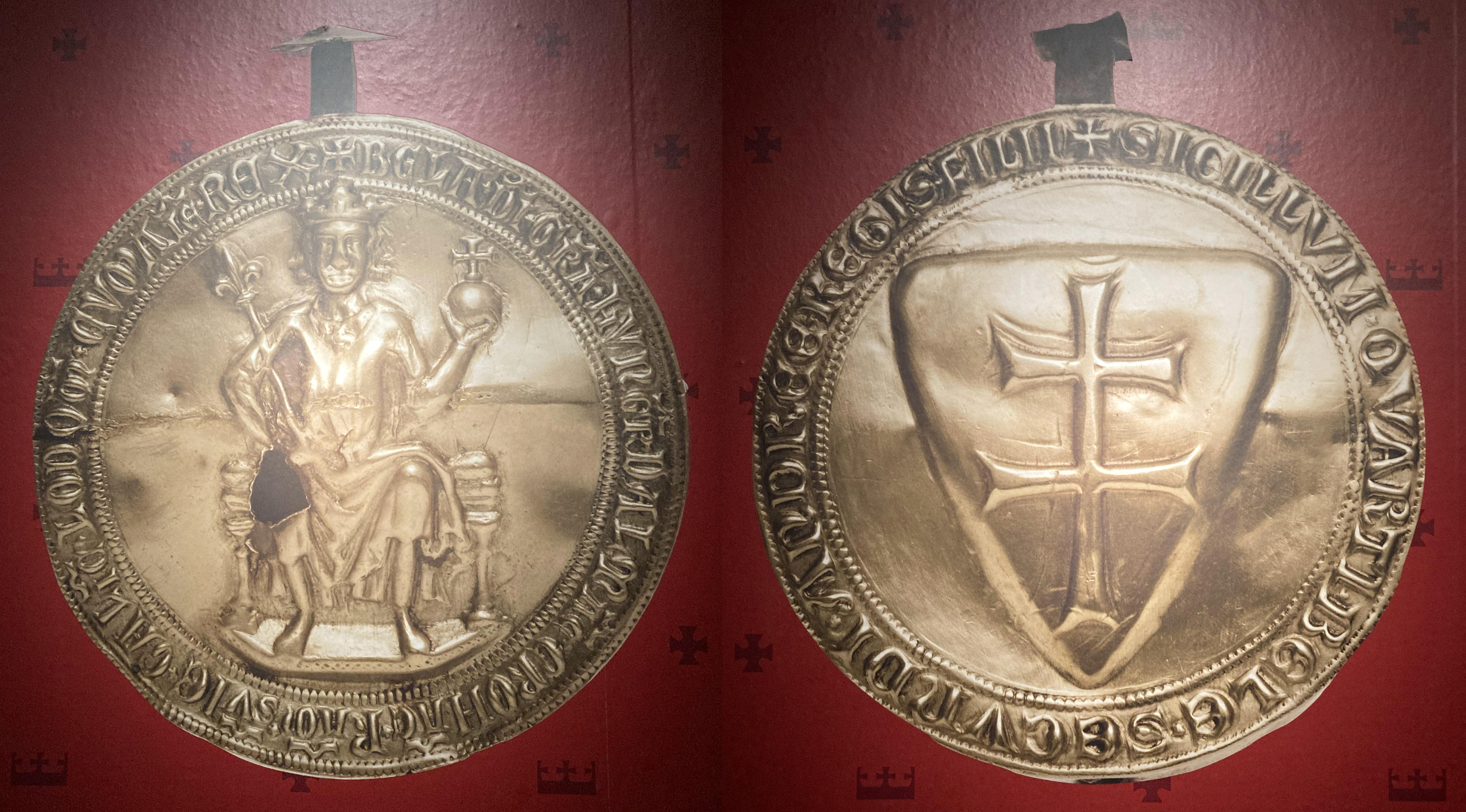
The seal of King Béla IV of Hungary from his Golden Bull

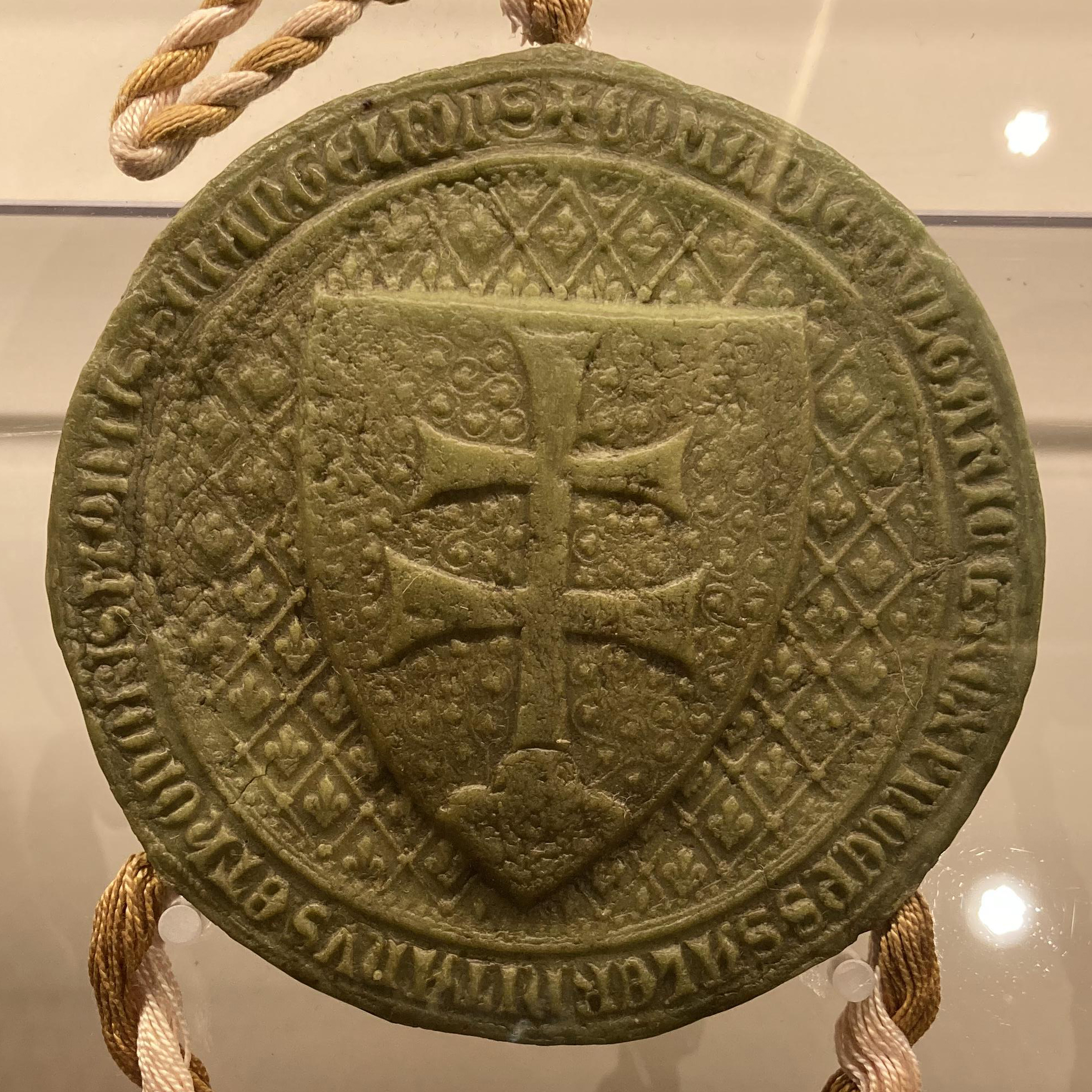
Reverse of the second double seal (1366-1382) of King Louis I of Hungary (1342-1382). The modern design of the coat of arms of Slovakia by Ladislav Čisárik was based on this medieval Hungarian seal.

== Three hills ==
The triple peak represents the three mountain ranges Tatra, Matra and Fatra which symbolized the northern mountainous part of the Kingdom of Hungary. (The Tatra and the Fatra ranges are in present day Slovakia.) This interpretation is probably the oldest and most frequent one – it can be traced back to the 16th century, but stems probably from the 15th century. According to István Werbőczy's "Tripartitum" from 16th century, the heaps represent the mountains in this order.

The three mountains below the double cross were used by King Ladislaus (1301–1305), who was crowned king of Hungary, but was a Czech from the house of the Přemyslids.

== Symbol of the Slovaks ==
=== Origins and colors ===
No later than the 16th century, the Slovaks started viewing the double cross also as a symbol of their nation. This fact manifested itself during the Revolution of 1848/1849 when part of Slovaks were fighting along with the Austrians against the Hungarians (though many Slovaks fought on the Hungarian side). A Slovak National Council was established for this purpose in August 1848 in Vienna. The present-day coat of arms was used on the seal of this Slovak National Council for the first time officially as the national symbol of Slovaks (instead of being the official symbol of Upper Hungary only). From that time on, the symbol has been used very frequently.

The colors used on the coat of arms are the three Slavic colors; red, white and blue (Slavic tricolor). Since the Upper Hungary coat of arms was already part of the coat of arms of the Kingdom of Hungary at that time, only the color of the three mountains was changed from green to blue (this occurred on the Slovak flag for the first time) to achieve the red-white-blue combination.

As for the origin of the red color (in the Slovak and in the Hungarian coat of arms), the coat of arms has often had the red color as an almost inseparable attendant of the double cross in the coats of many Hungarian and Slovak towns since the Middle Ages. Also, the coat of arms of Béla III is thought to have had a red background. In general, a red background color was used frequently for coats of arms in the late 12th and early 13th centuries in central Europe. One of the modern interpretations of the color is that it represents the bloody lining and symbolizes Slovak 'martyrdom' during the time of Magyarisation (19th century).

=== 20th century ===
In 1918, Czechoslovak troops began occupying northern Hungary in accordance with the territorial promises that the Triple Entente had made to Czechoslovak politicians during World War I. However, Slovakia (Upper Hungary) was initially occupied by Hungarian troops from the Hungarian Soviet Republic, who set up the Slovak Soviet Republic as a puppet regime. Its emblem was the red star, a symbol of communism. Following a brief war between Hungary, Czechoslovakia, and Romania, Slovakia was incorporated into Czechoslovakia.

In 1920, the Slovak coat of arms became part of the national coat of arms of Czechoslovakia.

Between 1939 and 1945, it was the state symbol of the Slovak Republic (also known as the First Slovak Republic).

In 1945, it became part of Czechoslovakia's coat of arms again. From 1960 to 1990 the symbol was officially forbidden because it was interpreted by the communists as a symbol of the fascist Slovak State. The old coat of arms was replaced in the Czechoslovak coat of arms by an artificial symbol consisting of Mt. Kriváň and three flames. The flames were supposed to symbolize the Slovak National Uprising of 1944.

On March 1, 1990, after the Velvet Revolution, the old coat of arms became the official symbol of the Slovak Republic, which was still part of Czechoslovakia. Based on the Constitution of the Slovak Republic of September 3, 1992, the same coat of arms became the symbol of independent Slovakia, which was established on January 1, 1993. A law of February 18, 1993, clarified the details of the coat of arms: for example, though not explicitly defined in the coat's blazon in the past, during the World War II era the cross was mostly depicted with convex endings of the stake and the bars; therefore the new description clearly reads to depict them as concave.

The coat of arms is used by the Slovak Air Force as its roundel.

Since 1992 the coat of arms is also placed on the Slovak flag.

== Photo gallery ==
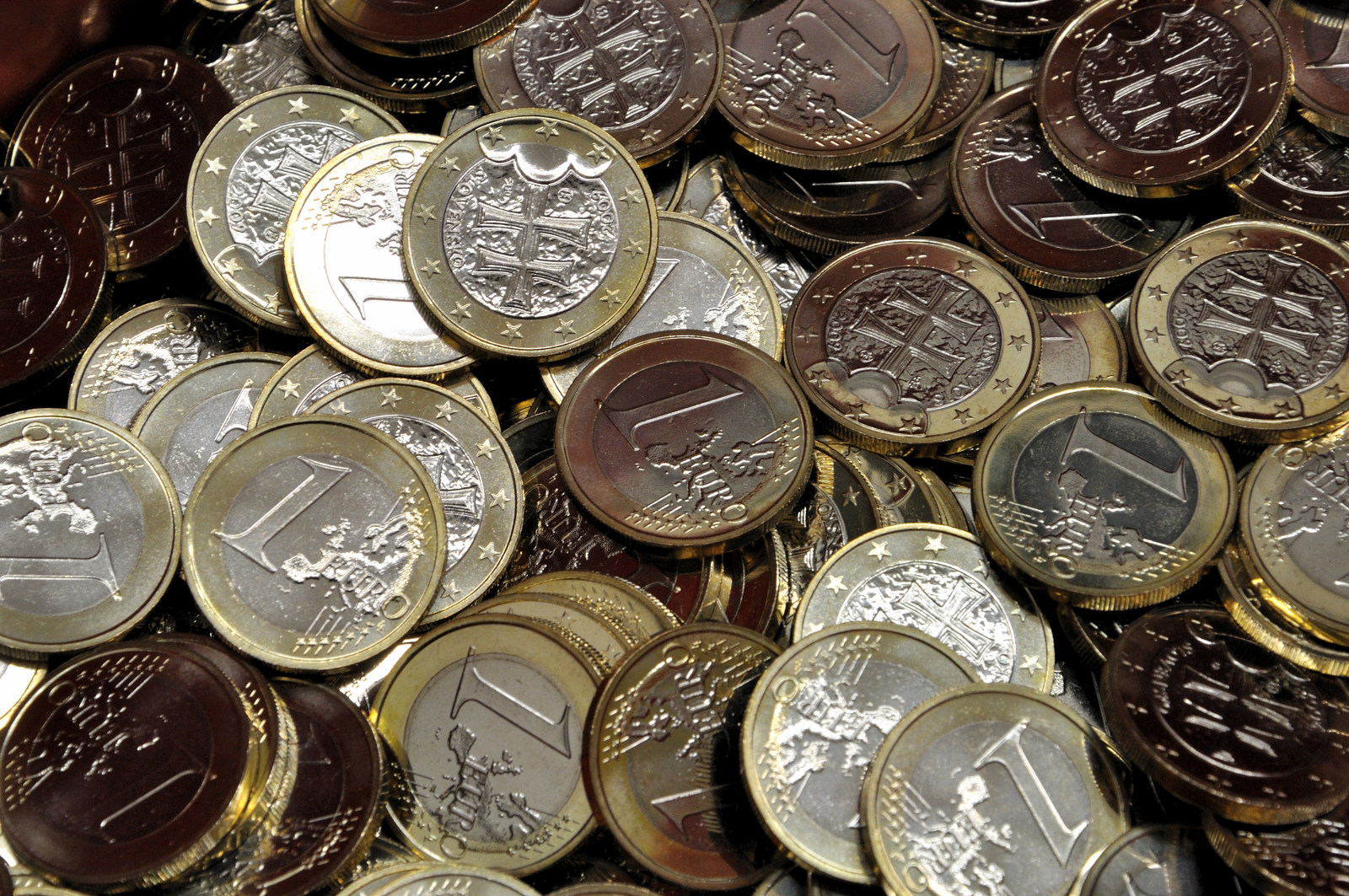
National side of Slovak euro coins with the double cross on three hills as featured in the Slovak coat of arms

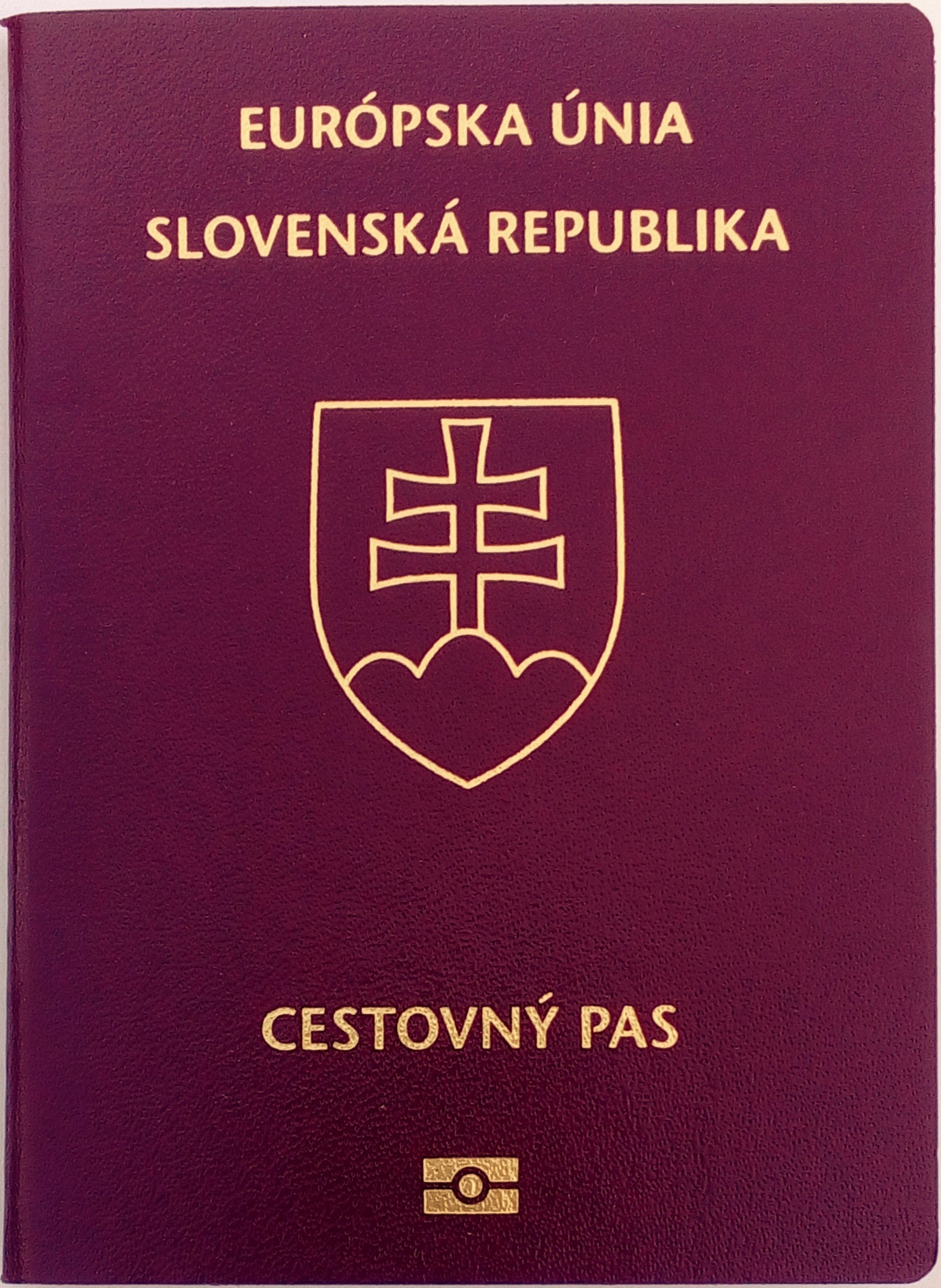
The front cover of Slovak passport with the coat of arms at the front page

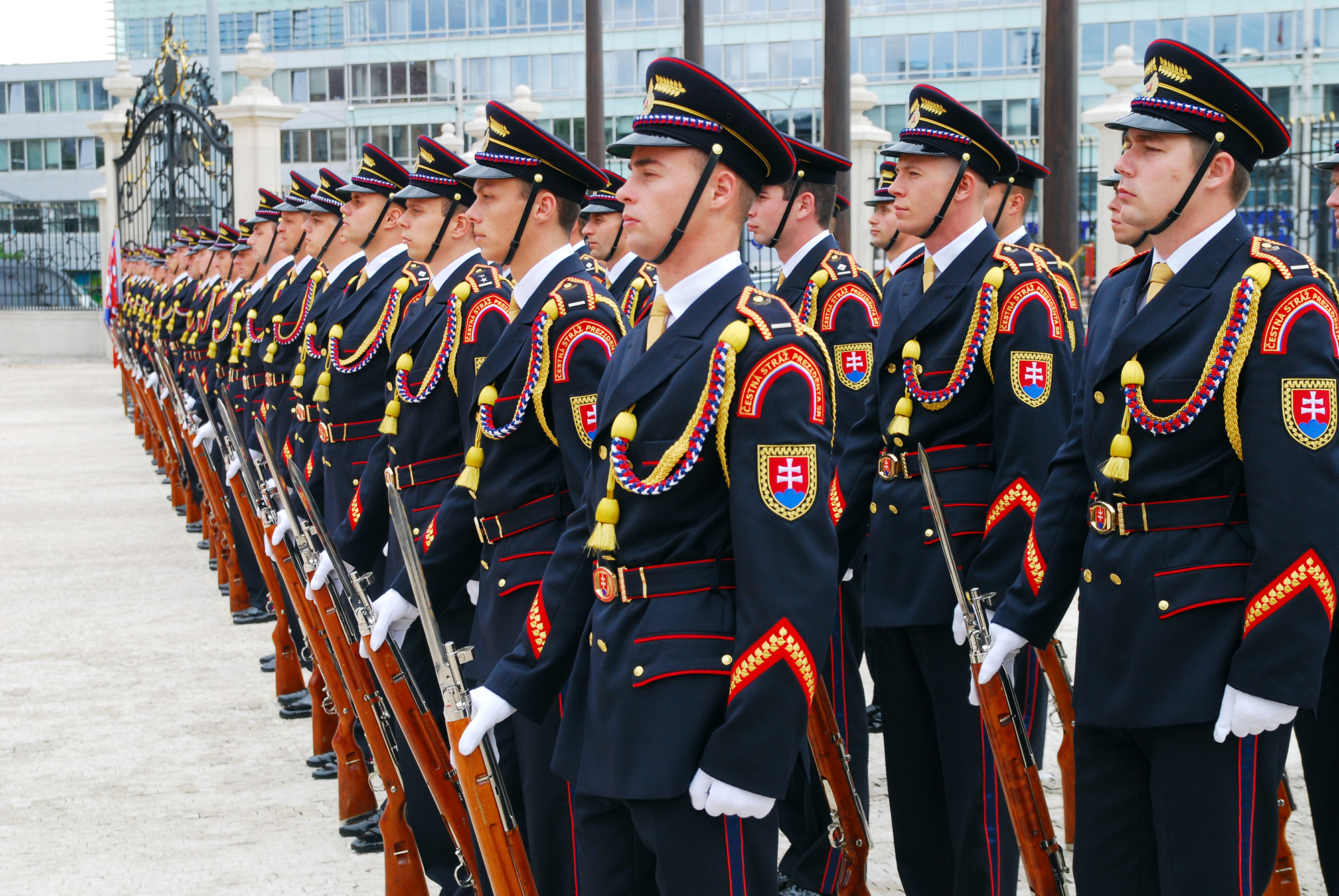
The Honour guards of President of Slovakia with the coat of arms in uniforms

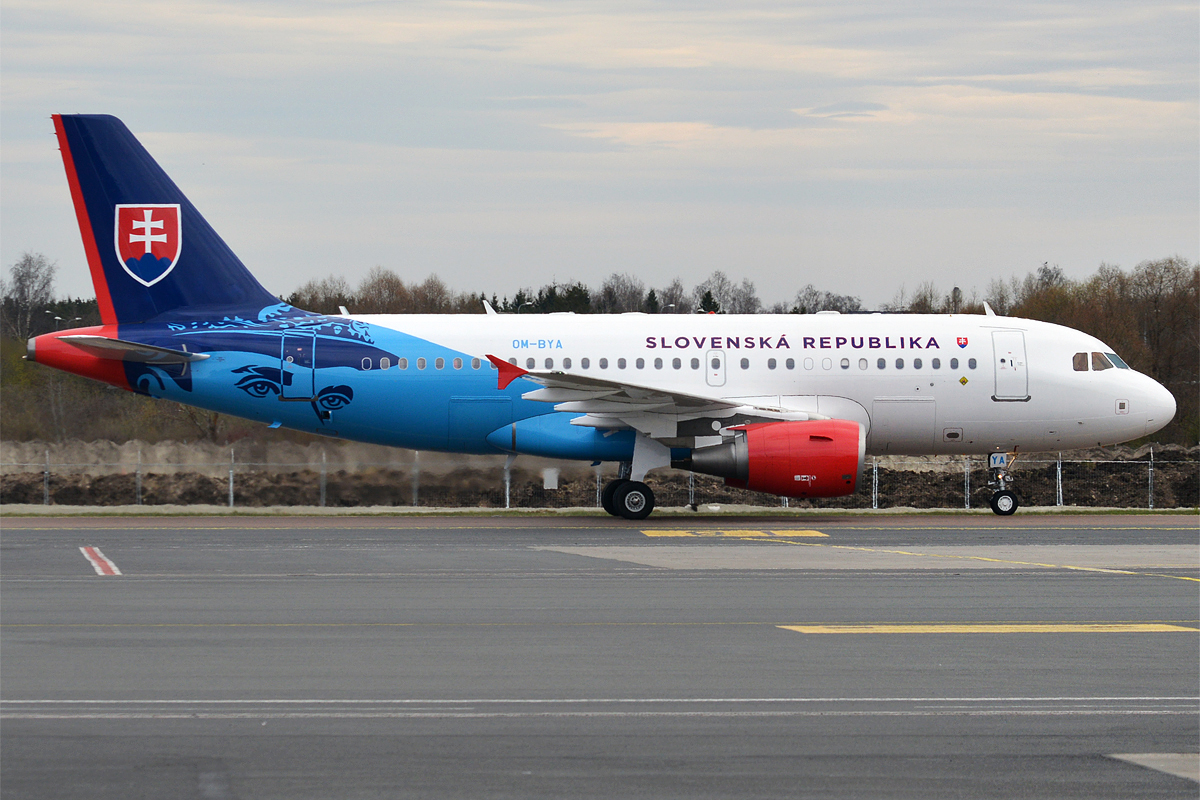
Coat of arms at the tail of an Airbus A319 operated by Slovak Government Flying Service

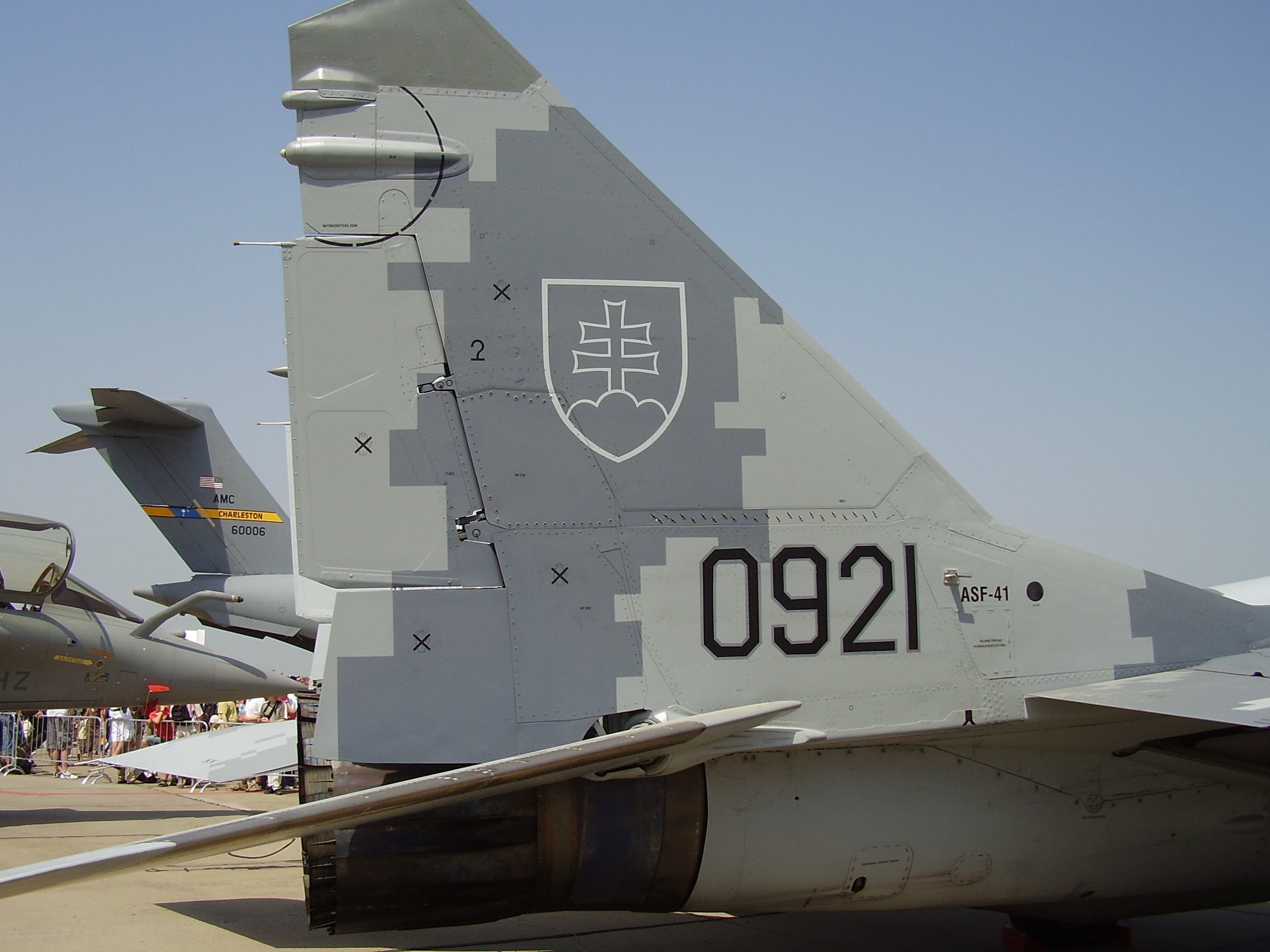
The coat of arms being derived to be the low-visibility insignia of Slovak Air Force

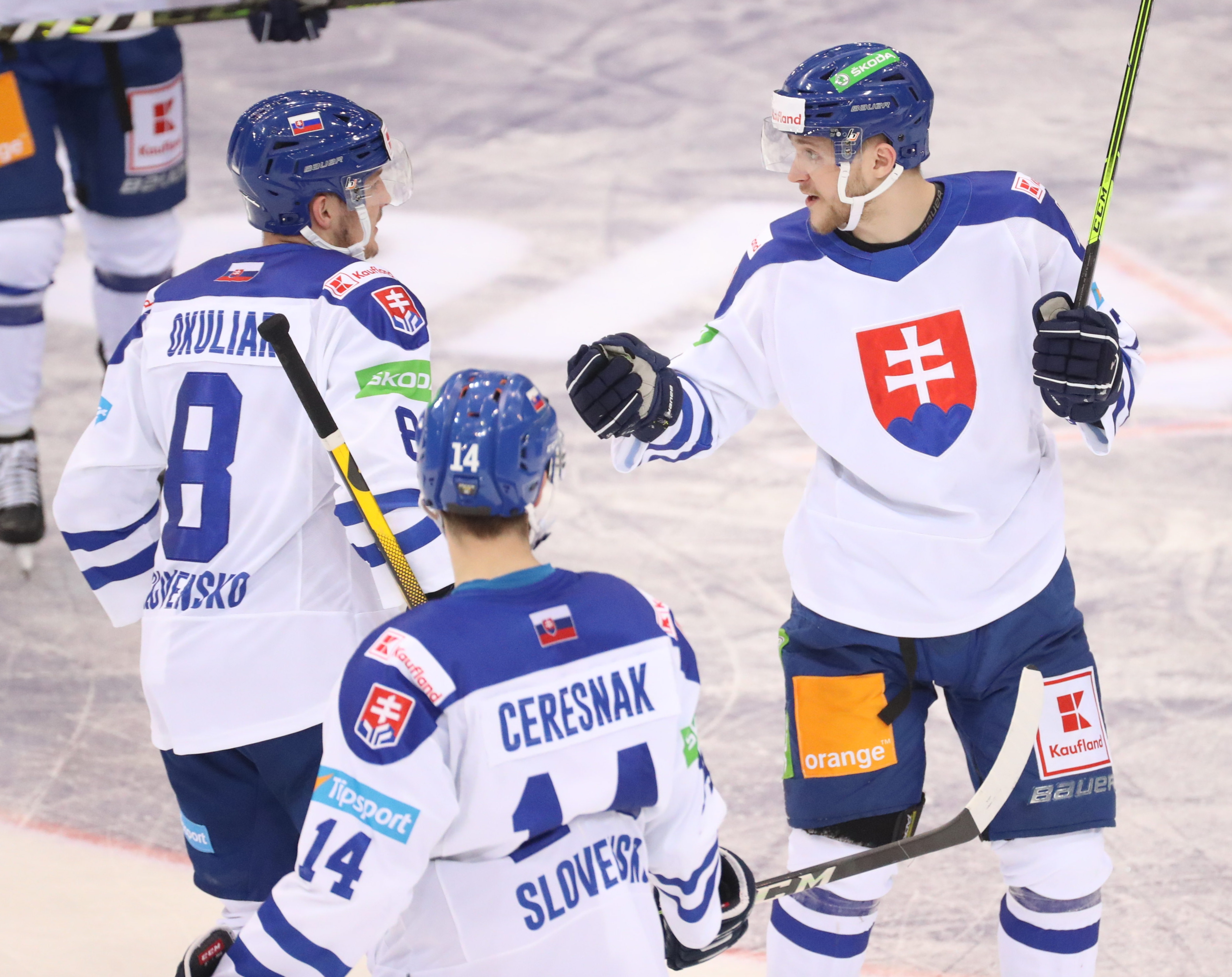
Men's national ice hockey team with the coat of arms in dresses

== Historical coat of arms ==
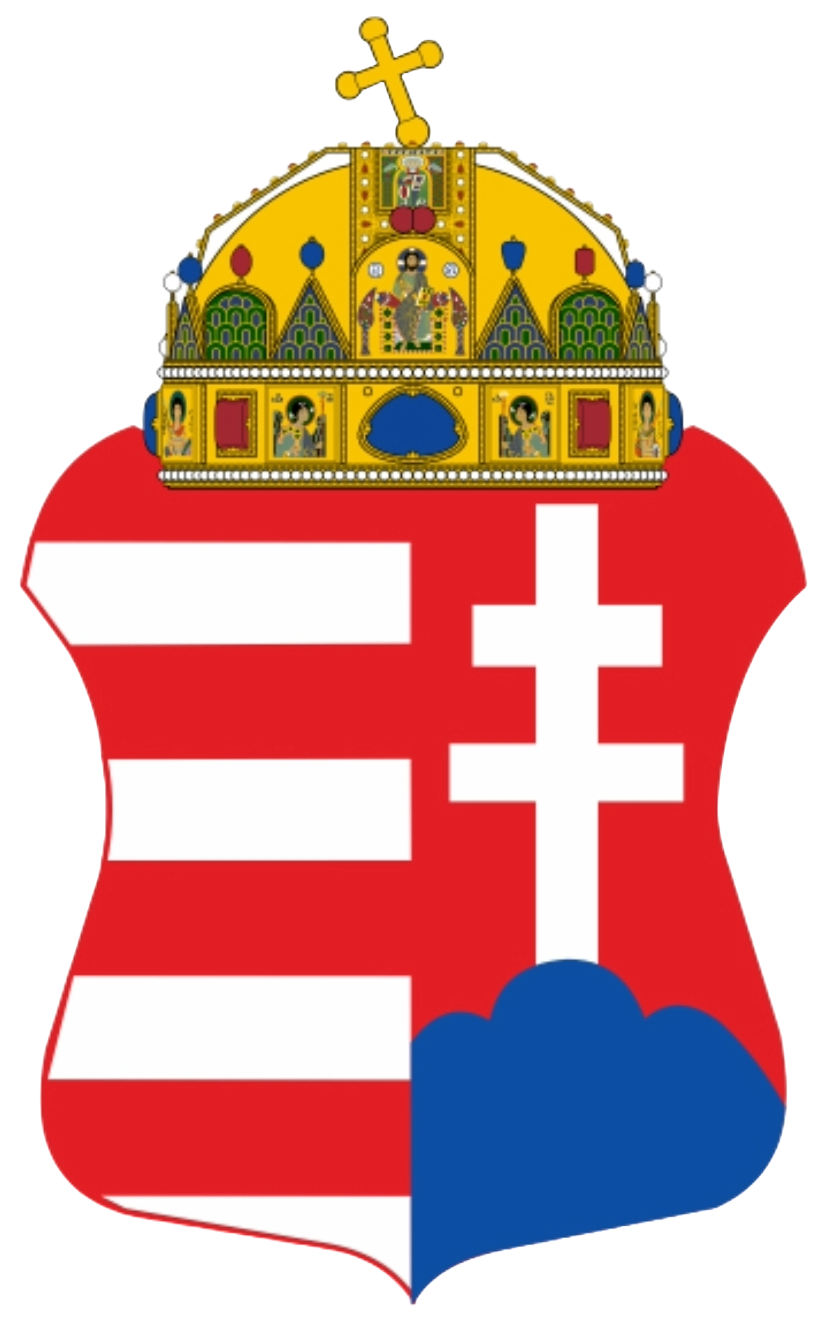
This coat of arms from the Slovak Uprising of 1848 was one of the first depictions of Slovak coat of arms with three hills in blue color. On this coat of arms, whole Hungarian coat of arms was adopted, along with Árpád stripes
(1848–1849)

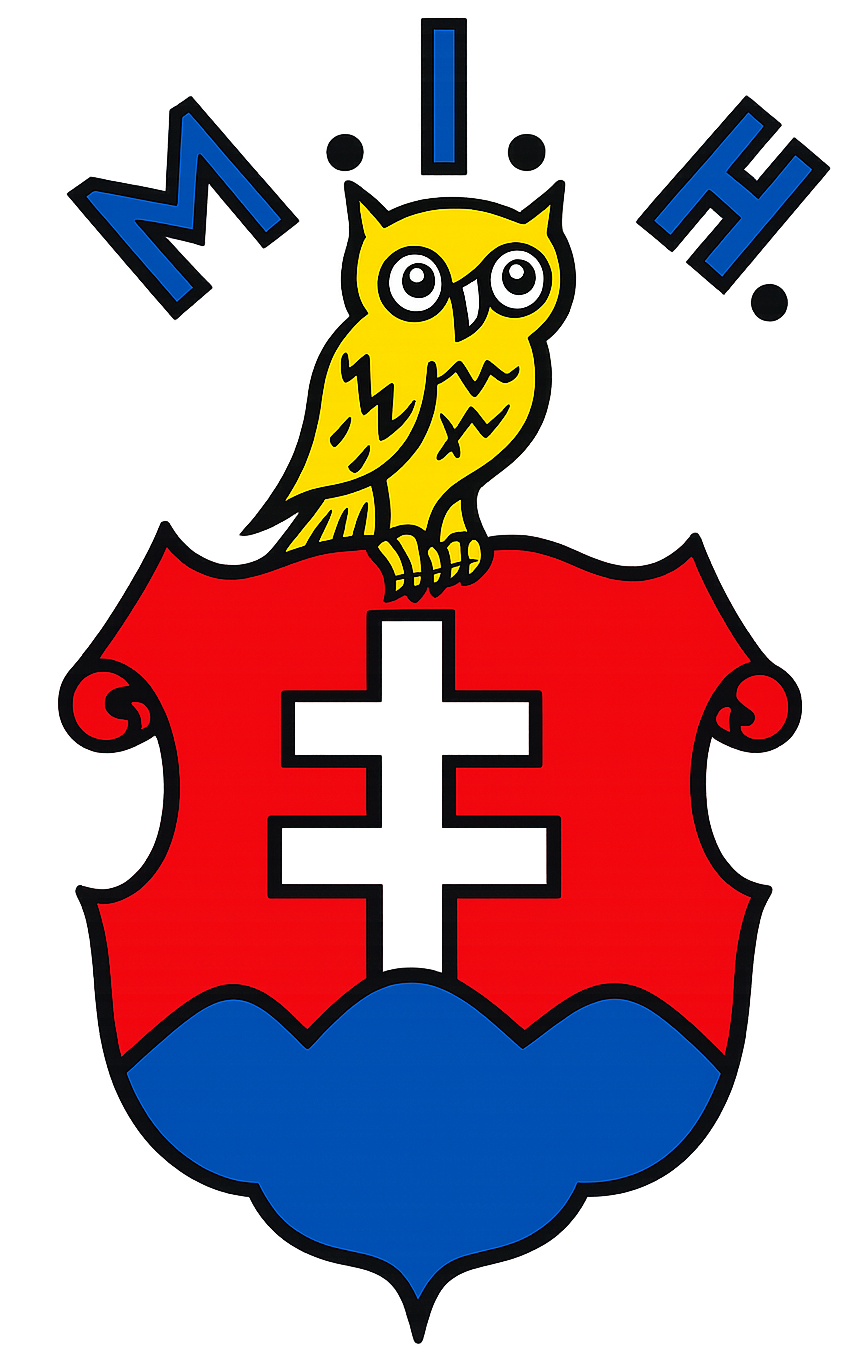
Slovak coat of arms based on the personal seal of Jozef Miloslav Hurban — a revolutionary leader of the Slovak Uprising of 1848 and chairman of the Slovak National Council

Coat of arms of Slovak Soviet Republic
(1919)

Coat of Arms of Czechoslovak Legion, which was used before creation of official Czechoslovak symbols. Occasionally it was depicted with green hills
(1914–1920)

Lesser coat of arms of Czechoslovakia
(1920–1939)
(1945–1960)

Middle coat of arms of Czechoslovakia
(1920–1939)
(1945–1960)

Greater coat of arms of Czechoslovakia
(1920–1939)
(1945–1960)

Coat of arms of Autonomous Slovak land within the Second Czechoslovak Republic
(1938–1939) and
First Slovak Republic
(1939–1945)

Coat of arms of Czechoslovak Socialist Republic
(1960–1990)

Coat of arms of Slovak Socialist Republic within Czechoslovak Socialist Republic
(1969–1990)

Coat of arms of Czech and Slovak Federative Republic
(1990–1992)

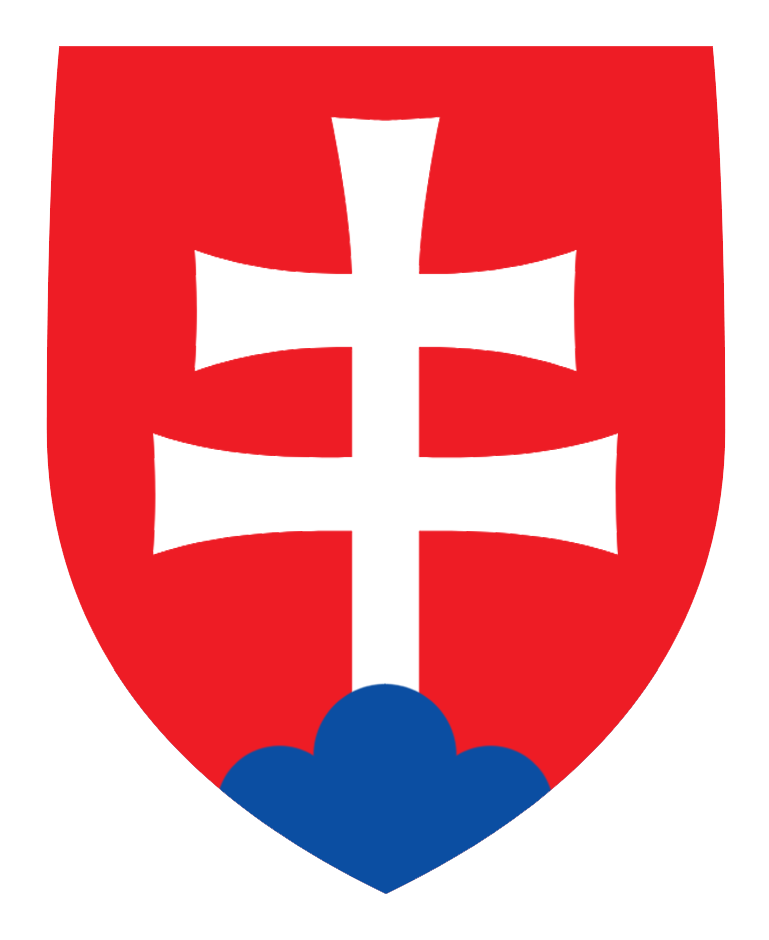
A reproduction of the rejected proposal for the coat of arms of the Slovak Republic, designed by heraldist Jozef Novák based on the seal of Louis I of Hungary

Coat of arms of Slovak Republic within Czech and Slovak Federative Republic
(1990–1992)

== See also ==
- Slovak heraldry
- Flag of Slovakia
- National Seal of Slovakia
- Slovak euro coins
- Coat of arms of Hungary
- Armorial of sovereign states
