= Illschwang =

- Municipality
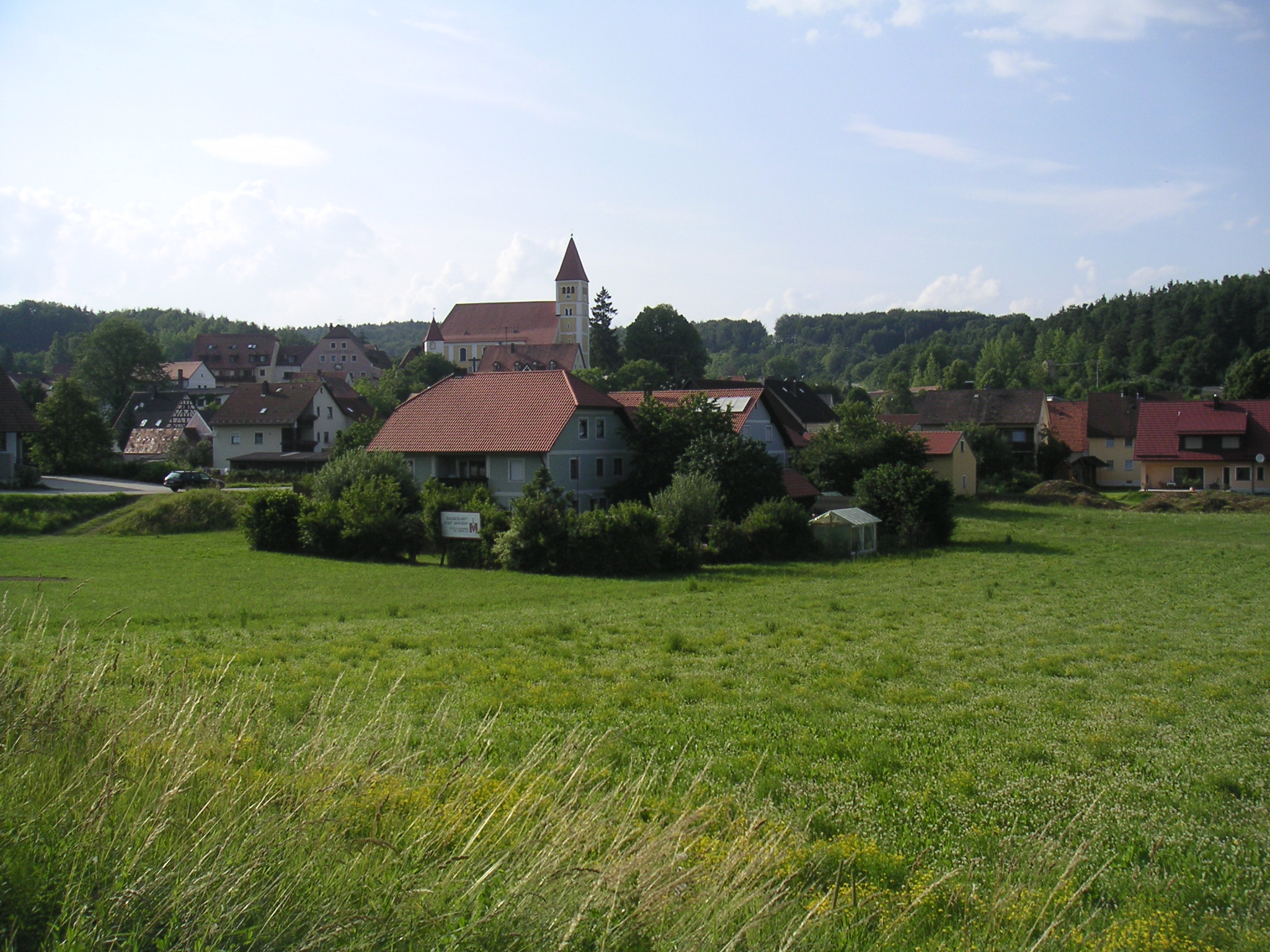
- View of the central part of Illschwang

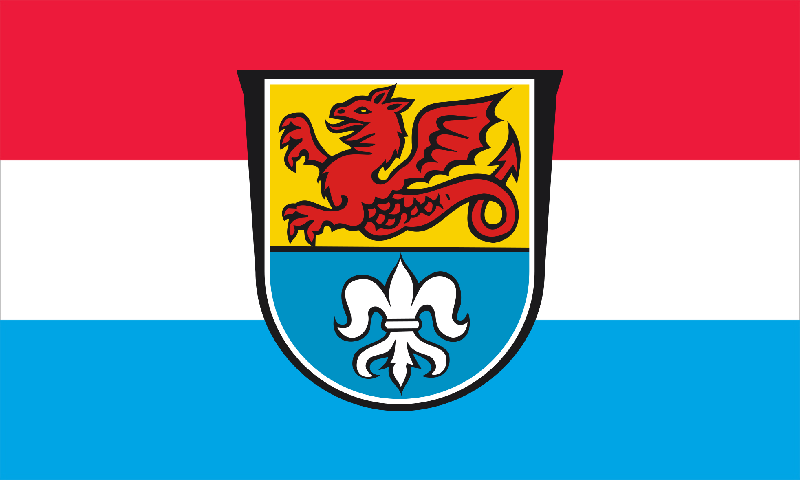
- Flag Coat of arms

- Location of Illschwang within Amberg-Sulzbach district
- Interactive map of Illschwang
- Location within Germany Location within Bavaria
- Coordinates: 49°27′N 11°41′E
- Country: Germany
- State: Bavaria
- Admin. region: Oberpfalz
- District: Amberg-Sulzbach
- Municipal assoc.: Illschwang

Government
  - Mayor (2020–26): Dieter Dehling (CSU)

Area
  - Total: 54.22 km^{2} (20.93 sq mi)
- Elevation: 488 m (1,601 ft)

Population (2025-12-31)
  - Total: 2,099
  - Density: 38.71/km^{2} (100.3/sq mi)
- Time zone: UTC+01:00 (CET)
  - Summer (DST): UTC+02:00 (CEST)
- Postal codes: 92278
- Dialling codes: 09666
- Vehicle registration: AS
- Website: www.illschwang.de

Illschwang (German pronunciation: [ˈɪlʃvaŋ]) is a municipality in the district of Amberg-Sulzbach in Bavaria in Germany.

== Geography ==
Apart from Illschwang the municipality consists of the following villages:

- Aichazandt
- Altensee
- Angfeld
- Augsberg
- Bachetsfeld
- Bodenhof
- Dietersberg
- Einsricht
- Frankenhof
- Gehrsricht
- Götzendorf
- Haar
- Hackern
- Hermannsberg
- Hermannsdorf
- Kühnhof
- Mörswinkl
- Neuöd
- Ödputzberg
- Ottmannsfeld
- Pesensricht
- Pfaffenhof
- Pürschläg
- Reichertsfeld
- Ritzelsdorf
- Ritzenfeld
- Schöpfendorf
- Schwand
- Seibertshof
- Wirsfeld
- Woffenricht
