= National Seal of Slovakia =

National Seal of the Slovak Republic
- Armiger: Slovak Republic
- Adopted: 1993
- Motto: Slovenská republika ('Slovak Republic')

The National Seal of Slovakia (Štátna pečať Slovenskej republiky) is one of the national symbols of Slovakia and is used as the official seal of state, with the President of Slovakia as its holder.

== Description ==
The national seal is round with a diameter of 45 mm. In the center of the seal is the state coat of arms, shown with heraldic hatching to indicate colors. Around the coat of arms is the inscription SLOVENSKÁ REPUBLIKA ('Slovak Republic'). At the bottom of the seal is a linden leaf, a traditional national symbol. The seal is defined both in the Act on State Symbols and in Article 9 of the Constitution of Slovakia.

== Use ==
The seal is applied to the originals of the Constitution, constitutional laws, ratified international treaties, and the credentials of ambassadors and other diplomatic representatives. The physical seal itself is kept by the President of Slovakia.

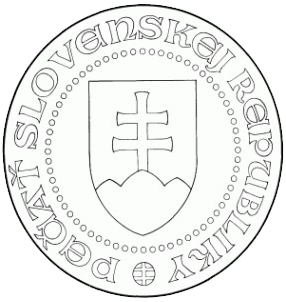
National Seal of First Slovak Republic
(1939–1945)

== See also ==
- Coat of arms of Slovakia
- Flag of Slovakia
- National symbols of Slovakia
