= Ladislav Čisárik =

Slovak heraldic artist

The national Coat of arms of Slovakia, designed by Ladislav Čisárik and Ladislav Vrtel.

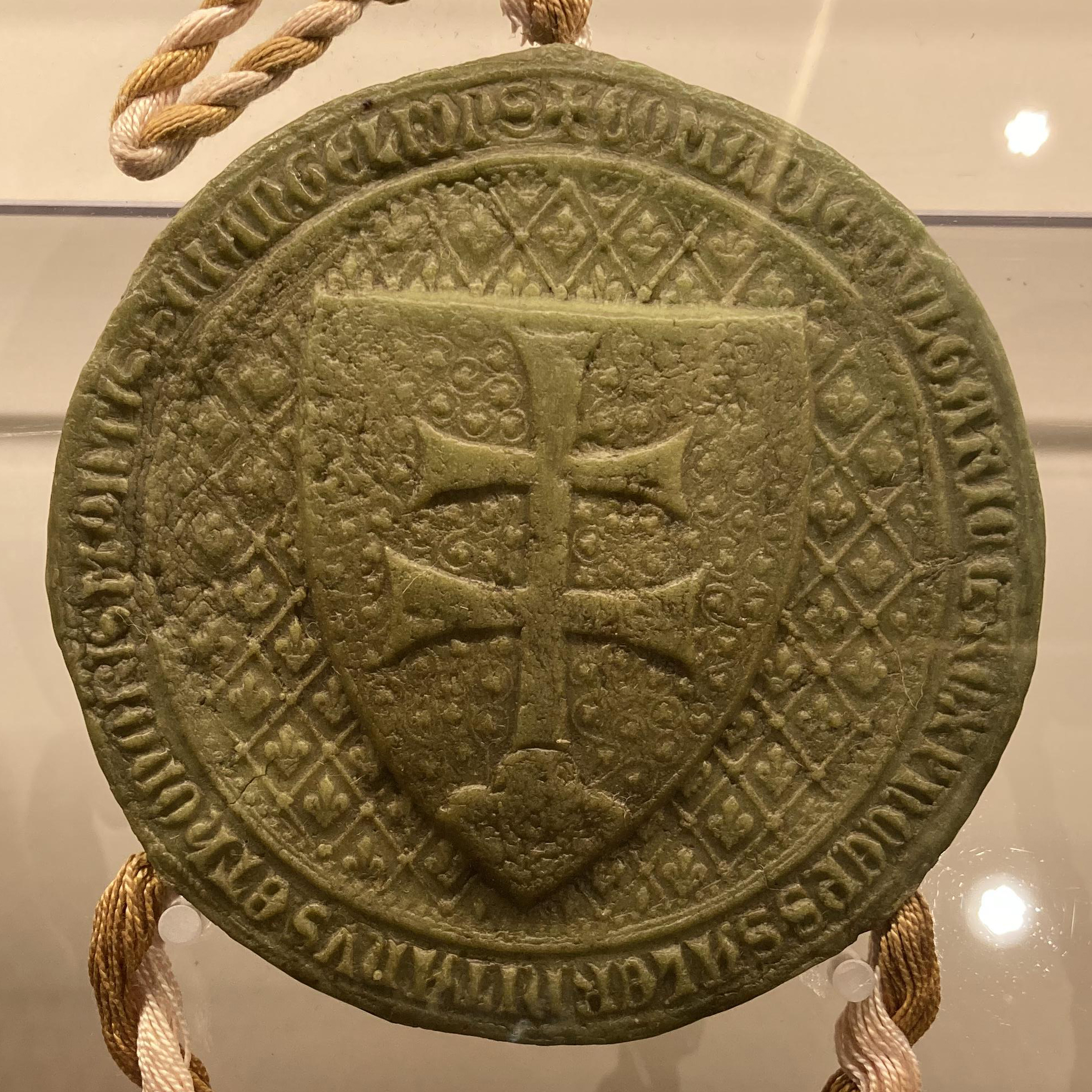
Reverse of the second double seal (1366–1382) of King Louis I of Hungary (1342–1382)

Ladislav Čisárik (29 December 1953 – 3 August 2017) was a Slovak heraldic artist, painter, and graphic designer. In 1990, Ladislav Čisárik and Ladislav Vrtel co-designed the coat of arms of Slovakia, the current flag of Slovakia, and the presidential standard of the president of Slovakia. He also designed or modified the coat of arms and seals for more than 100 towns and municipalities in Slovakia.

== Biography ==
Ladislav Čisárik was born on 29 December 1953. He owned and operated his own graphic design studio, called Signum, in Bratislava from 1979 until his death in 2017.

Ladislav Čisárik worked with the Heraldic Commission of Ministry of the Interior to create new Slovak national symbols in the aftermath of the Velvet Revolution, including a new flag and coat of arms. Working together, he and Ladislav Vrtel, an expert in heraldry, created a new Coat of arms of Slovakia in 1990. Ladislav Čisárik and Vrtel based their modern design, which includes a double cross, on an existing 14th century Hungarian coat of arms, it was based on the seal of King Louis I of Hungary. However, they chose to enlarge and triple the size of the double cross on their new coat of arms because they considered the cross to be a meaningful national symbol. Čisárik and Vrtel also designed the flag of Slovakia, which came into force on 3 September 1992, and the new presidential standard, both of which incorporate their coat of arms.

In 1994, Ladislav Čisárik illustrated a guidebook called "Najstaršie rody na Slovensku" ("Oldest Homes in Slovakia"). He also released a map in poster format in 1996 which shows the official municipal flags and coats of arms for 136 cities in Slovakia.

Ladislav Čisárik died on 3 August 2017, following a serious illness, at the age of 63. He was survived by his wife, Emilia Čisáriková.
