= Illschwang (Verwaltungsgemeinschaft) =

- Verwaltungsgemeinschaft
- Location of Illschwang within Amberg-Sulzbach district
- Interactive map of Illschwang
- Location within Germany Location within Bavaria
- Coordinates: 49°27′N 11°41′E
- Country: Germany
- State: Bavaria
- Admin. region: Upper Palatinate
- District: Amberg-Sulzbach
- Seat: Illschwang
- Subdivisions: 2 municipalities

Area
  - Total: 116.65 km^{2} (45.04 sq mi)

Population (2025-12-31)
  - Total: 3,907
  - Density: 33.49/km^{2} (86.75/sq mi)
- Time zone: UTC+01:00 (CET)
  - Summer (DST): UTC+02:00 (CEST)
- Website: www.vgib.bayern

Illschwang is a Verwaltungsgemeinschaft (municipal association) in the district of Amberg-Sulzbach in Bavaria, Germany. Its seat is in Illschwang. It consists of the following municipalities:

1. Birgland
2. Illschwang
