= Fatra =

Fatra is the old or imprecise name of two mountain ranges in Slovakia.

- Veľká Fatra (Greater Fatra), in the Žilina and Banská Bystrica regions
- Malá Fatra (Lesser Fatra), in the Žilina and Trenčín regions

Both ranges belong to the Fatra-Tatra Area, a part of the Inner Western Carpathians.

In Islam, the term fatra refers to the three-year period (610–613) between the first revelation of Muhammad and the start of his ministry.
