= Flag of Slovakia =

Slovak Republic
- Flag of the Slovak Republic
- Use: National flag
- Proportion: 2:3
- Adopted: 23 November 1938; 87 years ago (tricolour only); 3 September 1992; 34 years ago (current design)
- Design: A horizontal tricolor of white, blue, and red; charged with coat of arms at the hoist side
- Designed by: Ladislav Čisárik; Ladislav Vrtel

The current form of the national flag of the Slovak Republic (Slovak: Vlajka Slovenskej republiky) was adopted by Slovakia's Constitution, which came into force on 3 September 1992. The flag of Slovakia, like many other flags of Slavic nations, uses the Pan-Slavic colours (white, blue, and red). In the hoist side of the flag is Slovakia's national coat of arms.

== History ==
Slovakia's flag in its current form (but with another coat of arms on it or without any arms) can be dated back to the revolutionary year 1848. It was also used semi-officially in Czechoslovakia before World War II, and by the Slovak Republic during World War II.

In 1990, the interior ministry tasked Ladislav Čisárik, a painter and heraldic artist, and Ladislav Vrtel, an expert in heraldry, with creating a new coat of arms and national flag. Čisárik and Vrtel based their artistic designs for a modern coat of arms of Slovakia and flag on an existing 14th-century coat of arms of Hungary, while enlarging the three hills to emphasize it as a national symbol. In addition to the national coat of arms and the national flag, the duo also designed a new presidential standard, which incorporates the same design as well.

The new flag was finally adopted (initially without Čisárik's and Vrtel's coat of arms) on 1 March 1990 as the flag of the Slovak Republic within Czechoslovakia. The coat of arms was added on 3 September 1992 and a special law describing the details of the flag followed in February 1993, after Slovakia became an independent country.

== Design ==
Since the first tricolor flag of Slovakia without the coat of arms was inspired by the flag of Russia since the revolutionary year 1848 (only the hues of red and blue differing), the Constitution of Slovakia in September 1992 added the national coat of arms at the hoist side, and surrounding by a narrow white fringe.

It is one of 28 national flags that contain overtly Christian symbols.

Construction sheet	Colors scheme	White	Blue	Red
	CMYK	0, 0, 0, 0	100, 80, 0, 0	0, 100, 100, 0
	HEX	#FFFFFF	#254AA5	#ED1C24
	RGB	255, 255, 255	37, 74, 165	237, 28, 36

== Photo gallery ==
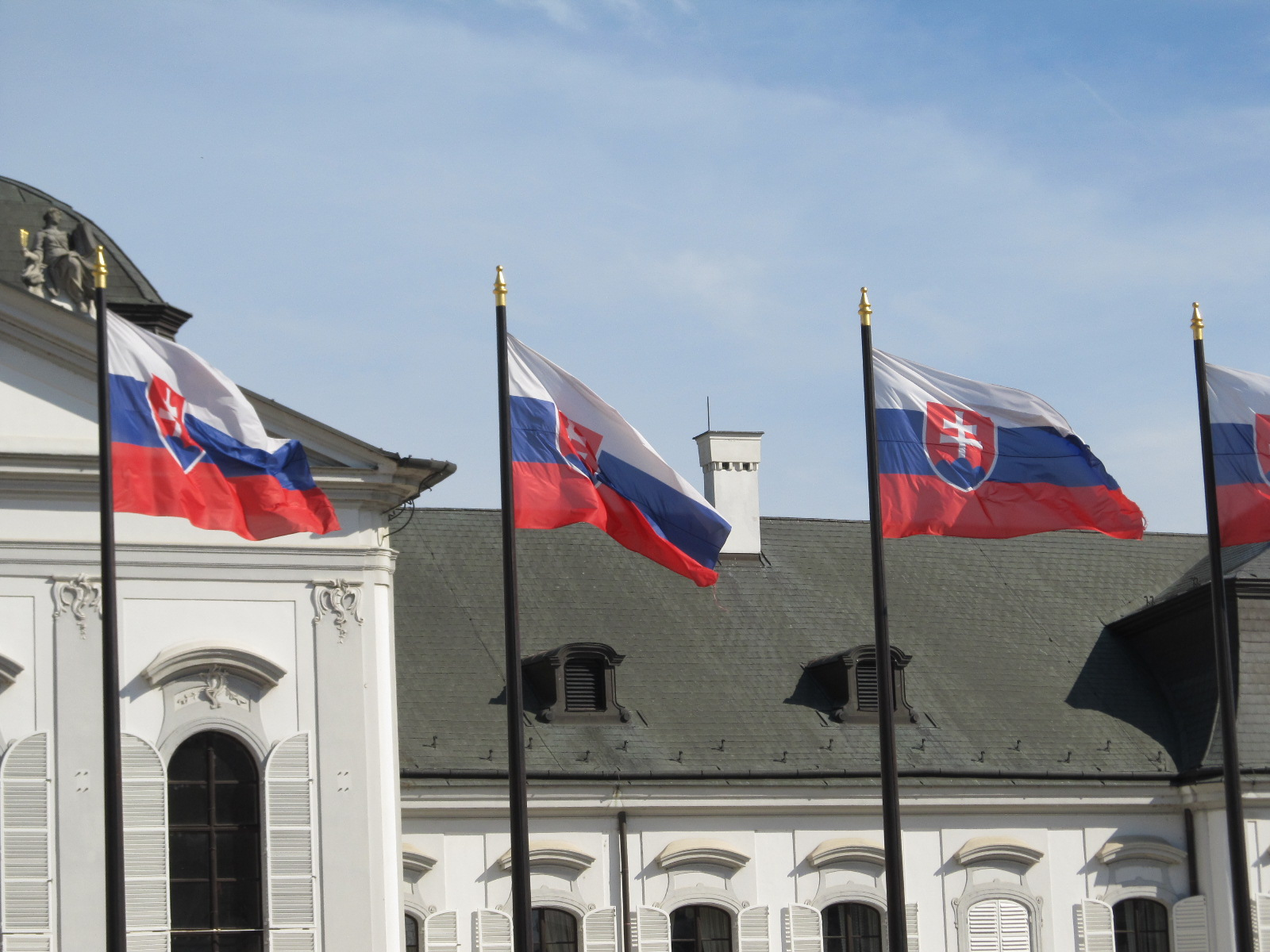
A line of Slovak flags on poles

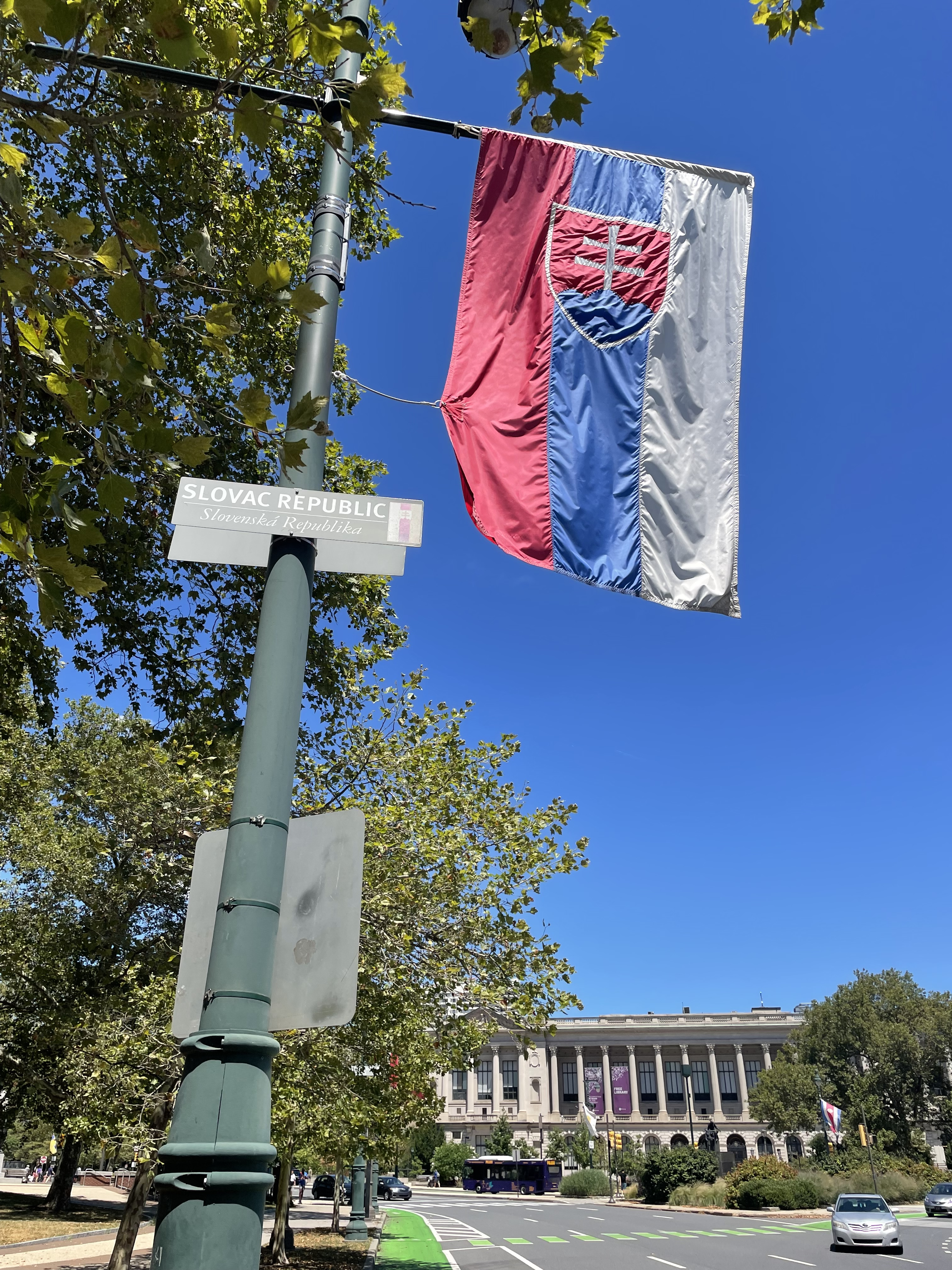
The correct vertical display of the Slovak flag (with rotated coat of arms)

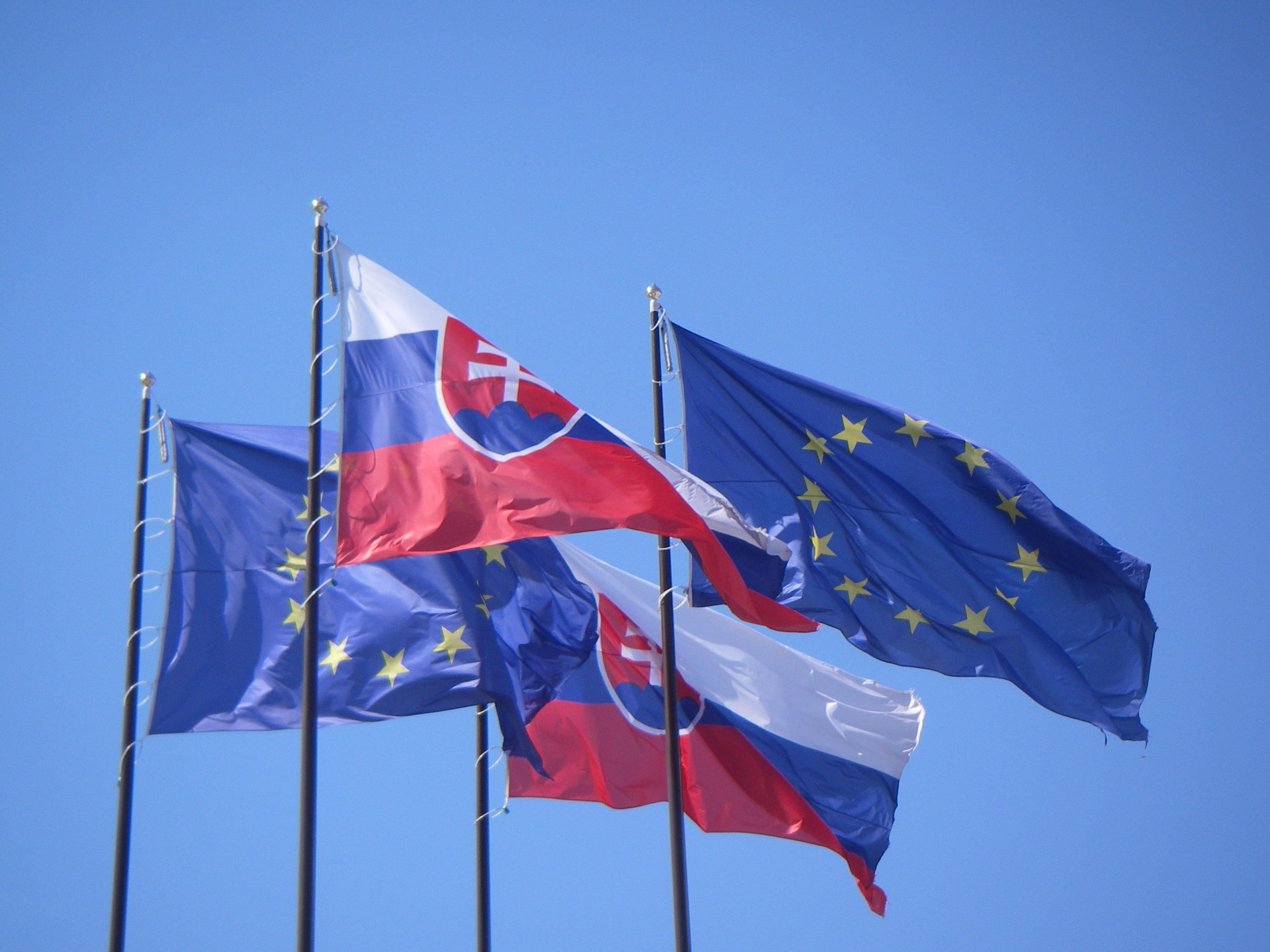
Slovak flag and European Union flag are often seen together front of government buildings

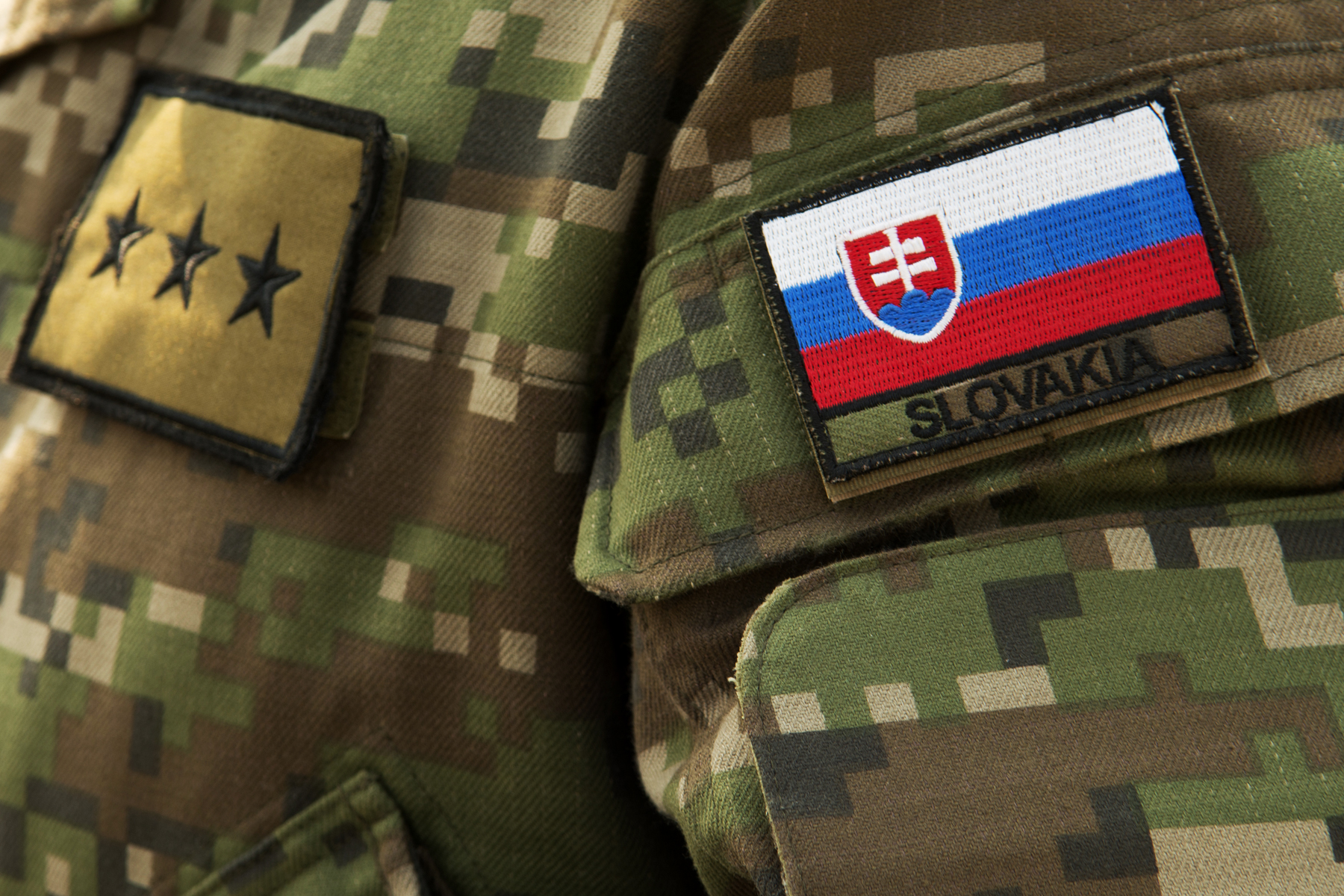
Flag of Slovakia in army uniform

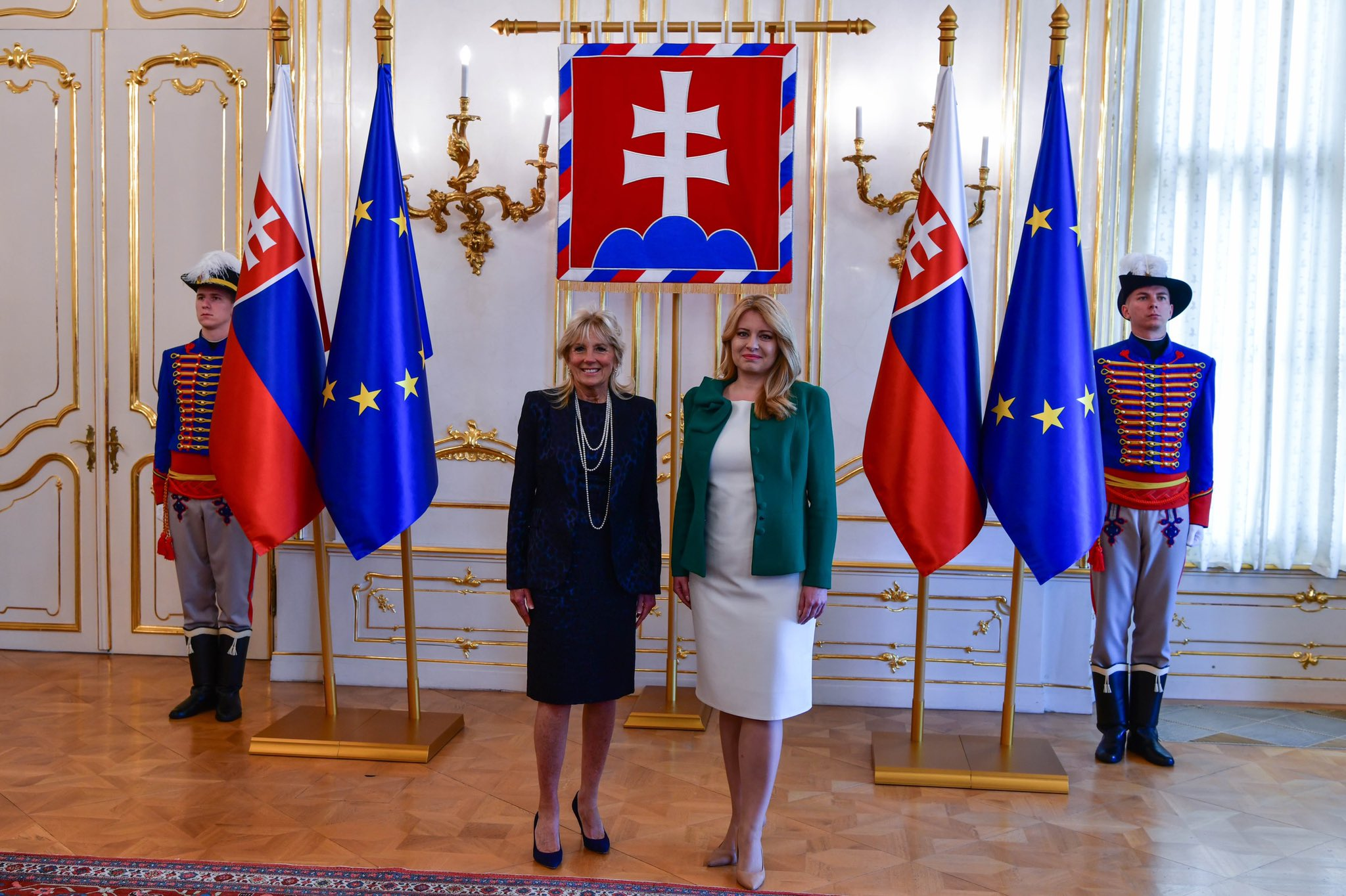
Presidential standard of Slovak Republic (centre) together with Slovak flags and European Union flags

== Presidential standard ==
Presidential standard of Czechoslovakia
(1920–1939)
(1945–1960)

Presidential standard of First Slovak Republic
(1939–1945)

Presidential standard of Czechoslovak Socialist Republic
(1960–1990)

Presidential standard of Czech and Slovak Federative Republic
(1990–1992)

Presidential standard of Slovak Republic
(since 1993)

== Historical flags ==
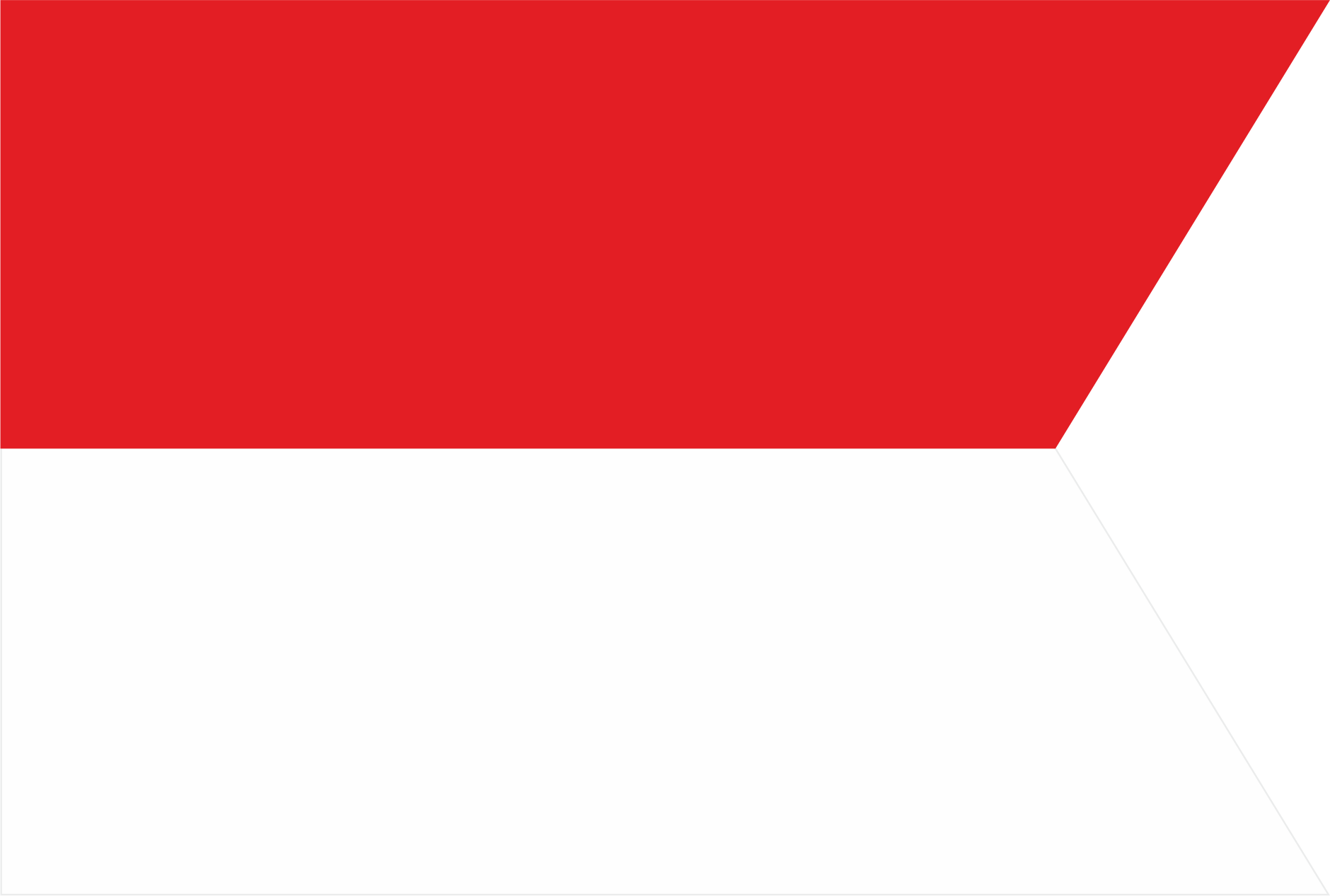
Slovak flag proposed by the Demands of the Slovak Nation
(1848)

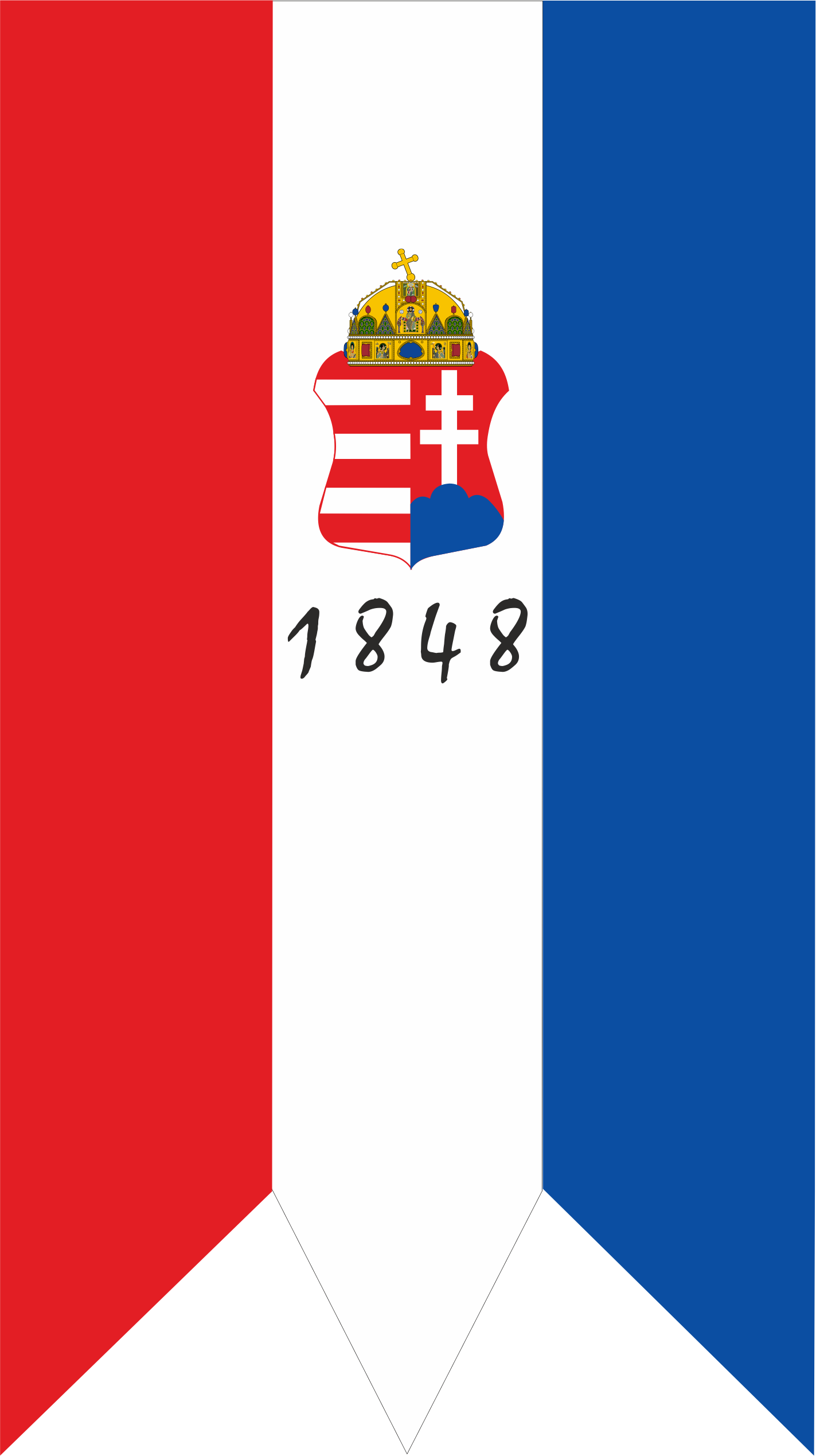
Flag used during the Slovak Uprising
(1848–1849)

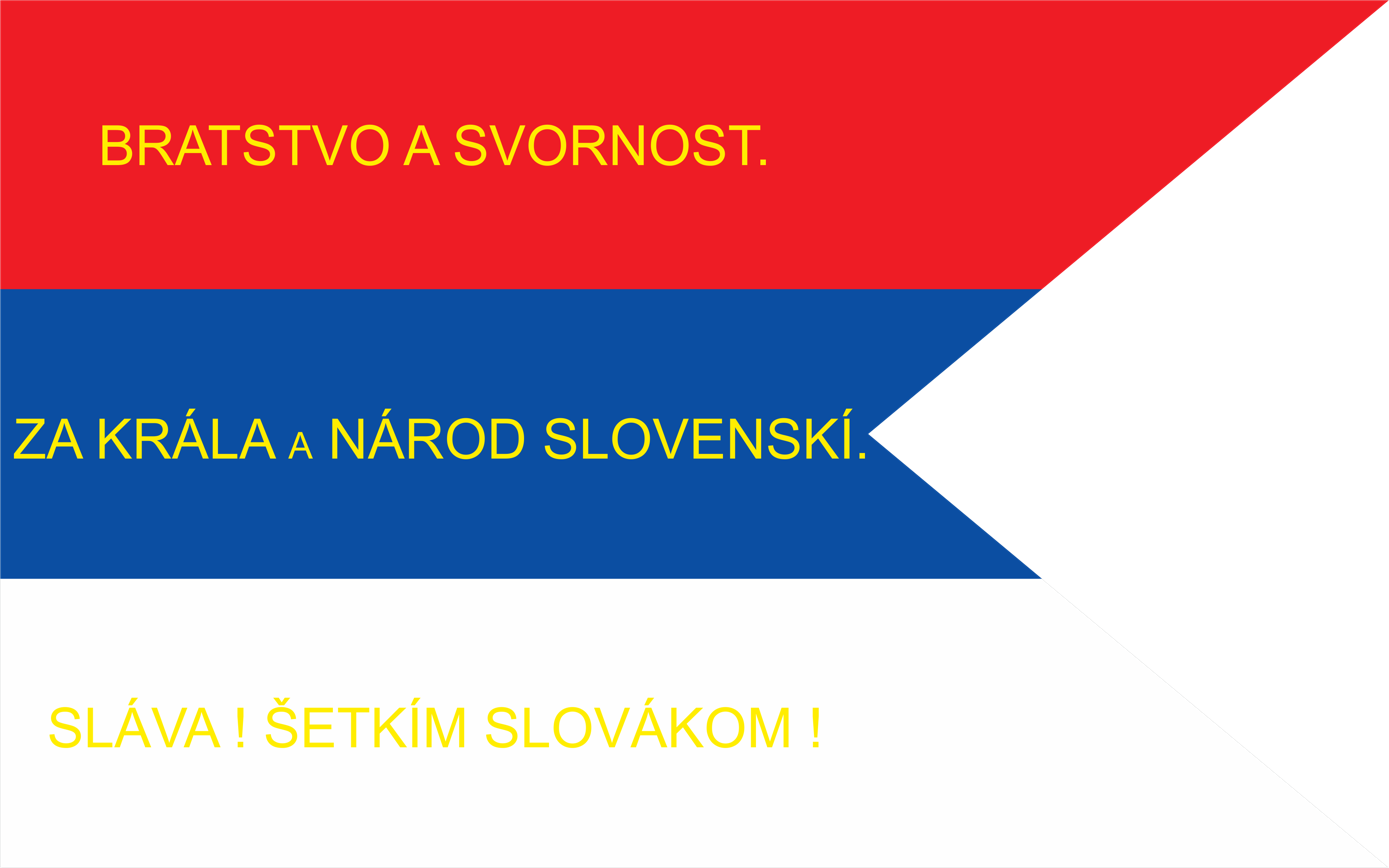
One of the more popular flags used by slovak volunteers during Slovak Uprising 1848. Flags from this period introduced blue color into the slovak flag for the first time, after the Slavic Congress. Used also as flag of Slovak National Council
(1848–1849)

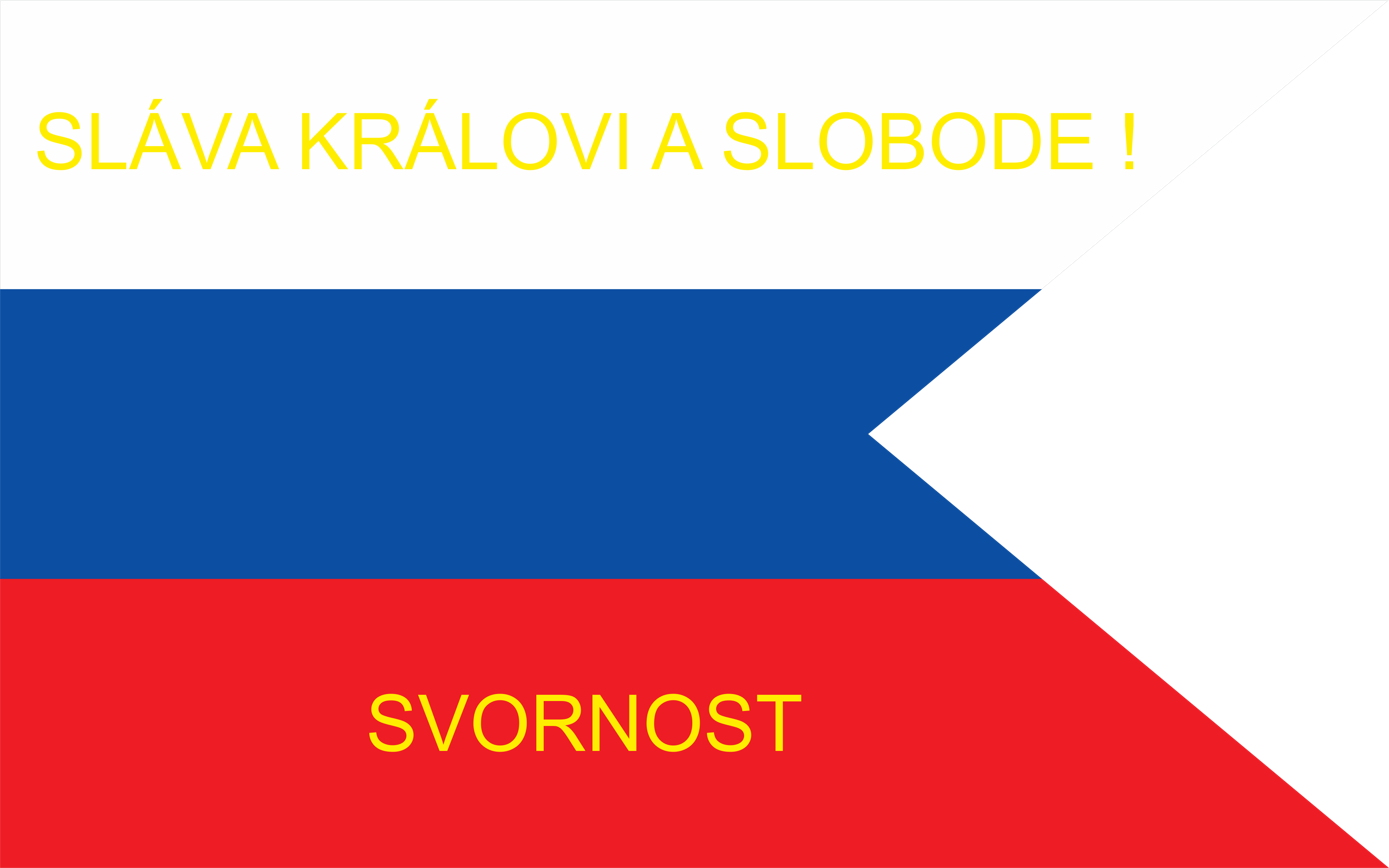
Another flag used during the Slovak Uprising
(1848–1849)

Flag of the Slovak Soviet Republic
(1919)

First flag of Czechoslovakia
(1918–1920)

Flag of Czechoslovakia
(1920–1939)
(1945–1992)
Czechoslovak government-in-exile
(1939–1945)

War flag of the First Slovak Republic, used by the country's military forces
(1939–1945)

Official flag of the
Autonomous Slovak land within the Second Czechoslovak Republic
(1938–1939)
First Slovak Republic
(1939–1945)
Slovak Socialist Republic within Czechoslovak Socialist Republic
(1969–1990)
Slovak Republic within Czech and Slovak Federative Republic
(1990–1992)

== See also ==
- Coat of arms of Slovakia
- National Seal of Slovakia
- List of Slovak flags
- Pan-Slavic colors
