= Birgland =

- Municipality
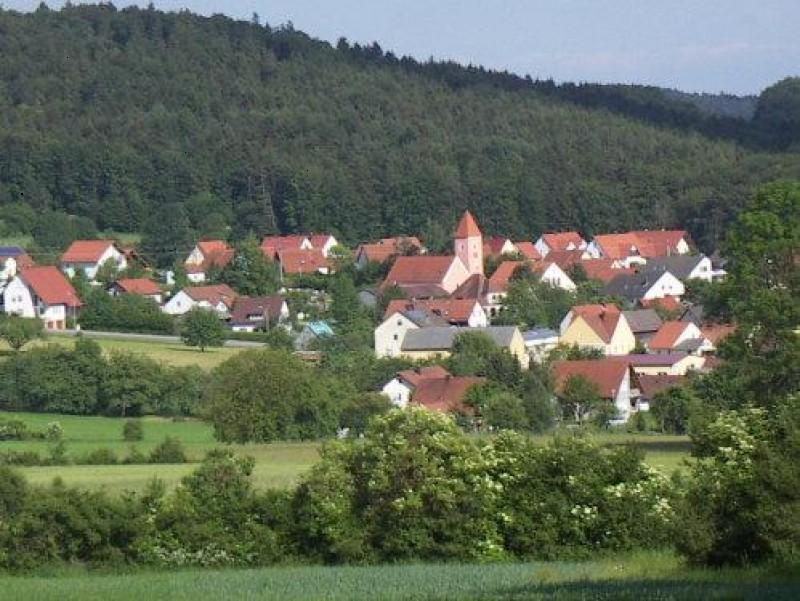
- Birgland

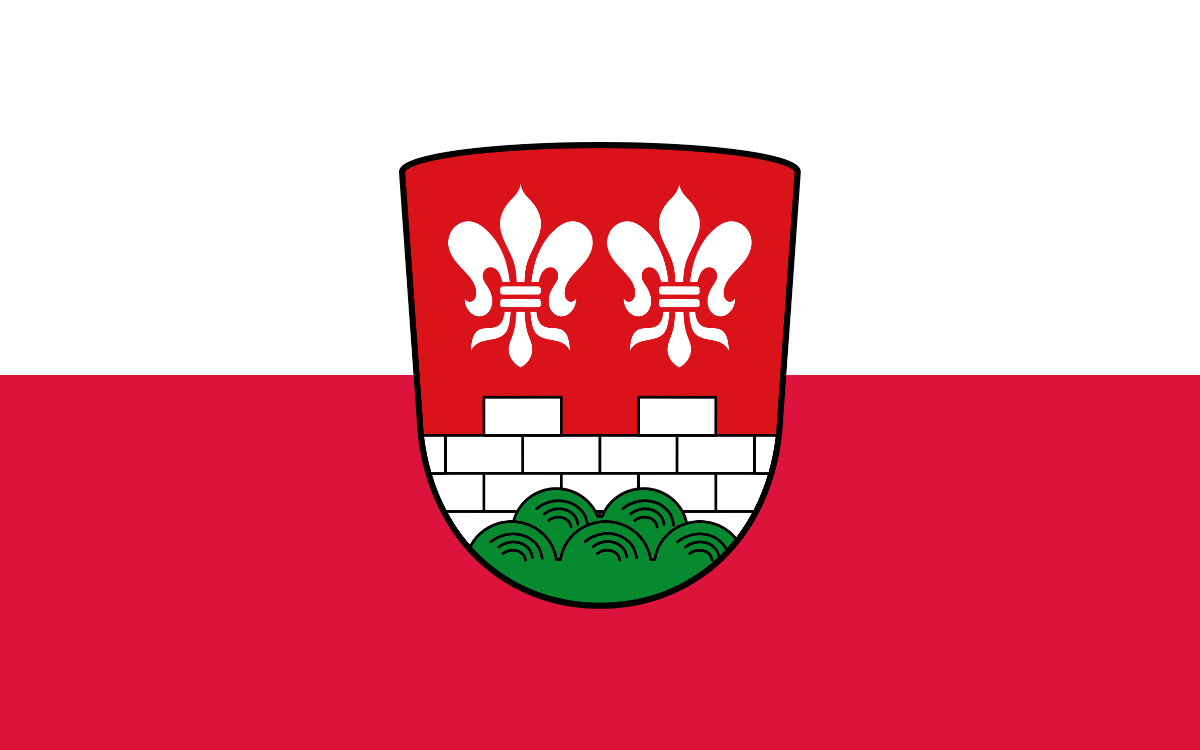
- Flag Coat of arms

- Location of Birgland within Amberg-Sulzbach district
- Interactive map of Birgland
- Location within Germany Location within Bavaria
- Coordinates: 49°25′N 11°38′E
- Country: Germany
- State: Bavaria
- Admin. region: Oberpfalz
- District: Amberg-Sulzbach
- Municipal assoc.: Illschwang

Government
  - Mayor (2020–26): Brigitte Bachmann (SPD)

Area
  - Total: 62.44 km^{2} (24.11 sq mi)
- Elevation: 390 m (1,280 ft)

Population (2025-12-31)
  - Total: 1,808
  - Density: 28.96/km^{2} (75.00/sq mi)
- Time zone: UTC+01:00 (CET)
  - Summer (DST): UTC+02:00 (CEST)
- Postal codes: 92262
- Dialling codes: 09666
- Vehicle registration: AS
- Website: www.birgland.de

Birgland (German pronunciation: [ˈbɪʁklant]) is a municipality in the district of Amberg-Sulzbach in Bavaria in Germany.

== Geography ==
There is no village called Birgland, the municipality Birgland consists of the following villages:

- Aicha
- Ammerried
- Ammersricht
- Baumgarten
- Betzenberg
- Buchhof
- Burkartshof
- Dickatshof
- Dollmannsberg
- Eckeltshof
- Eckertsfeld
- Frechetsfeld
- Fürnried
- Geigenwang
- Gronatshof
- Hainfeld
- Haslach
- Hirschricht
- Höfling
- Kegelheim
- Kutschendorf
- Leinberg
- Leinhof
- Lichtenegg
- Matzenhof
- Nonnhof
- Ödamershüll
- Ödhaag
- Ödthal
- Pleishof
- Poppberg
- Reichenunholden
- Riedelhof
- Rothsricht
- Schwend
- Schwenderöd
- Sunzendorf
- Tannlohe
- Troßalter
- Wolfertsfeld
- Woppenthal
- Wurmrausch
