= Kastl =

Kastl may refer to the following places in Bavaria, Germany:

- Kastl, Upper Bavaria, in the district of Altötting
- Kastl, Amberg-Sulzbach, in the district of Amberg-Sulzbach
- Kastl, Tirschenreuth, in the district of Tirschenreuth
- Kastl Abbey, a former monastery in Kastl, Amberg-Sulzbach
