= Hohenburg, Bavaria =

Hohenburg
- Municipality
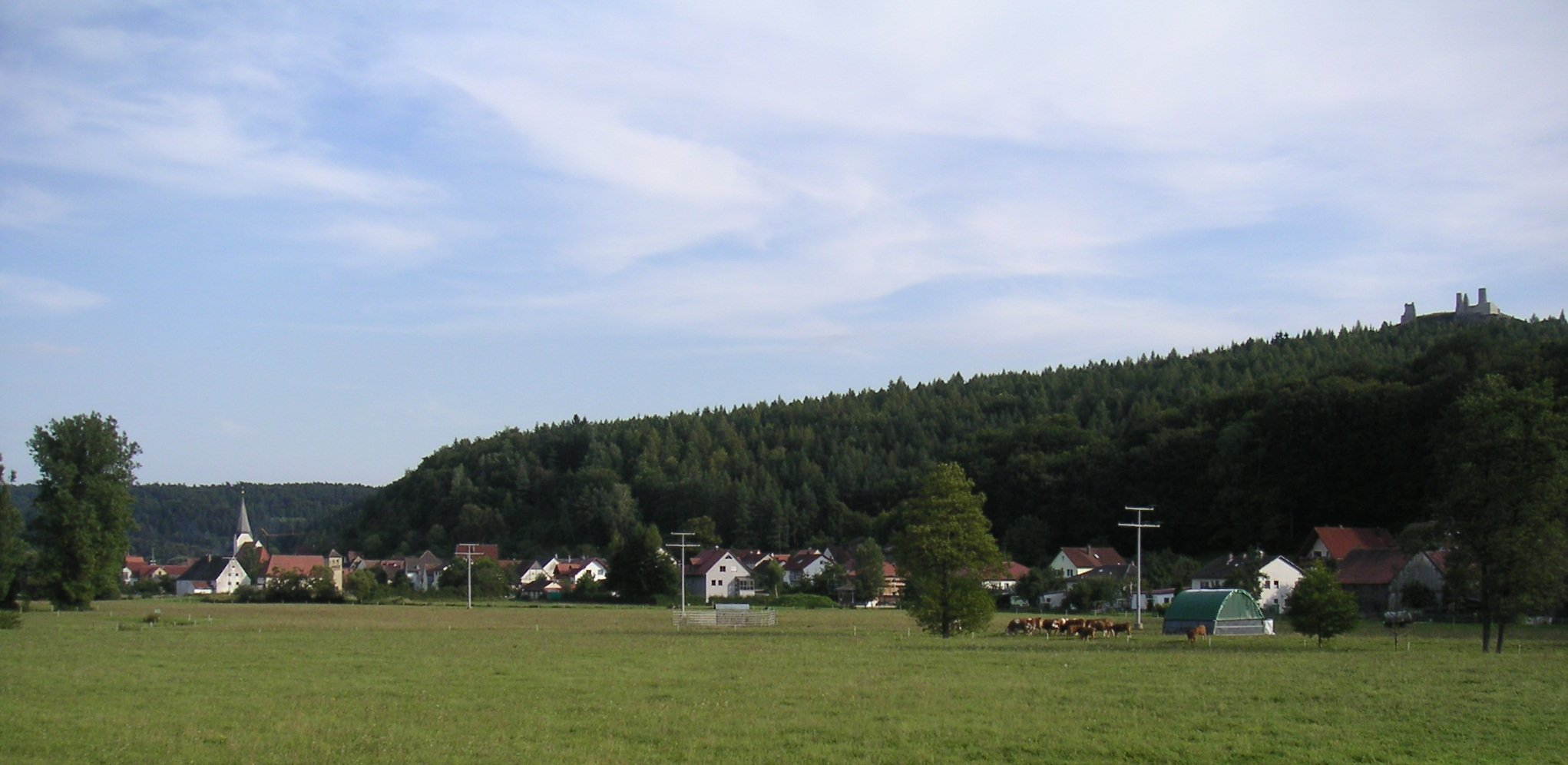
- Panorama of Hohenburg from the direction of Kastl

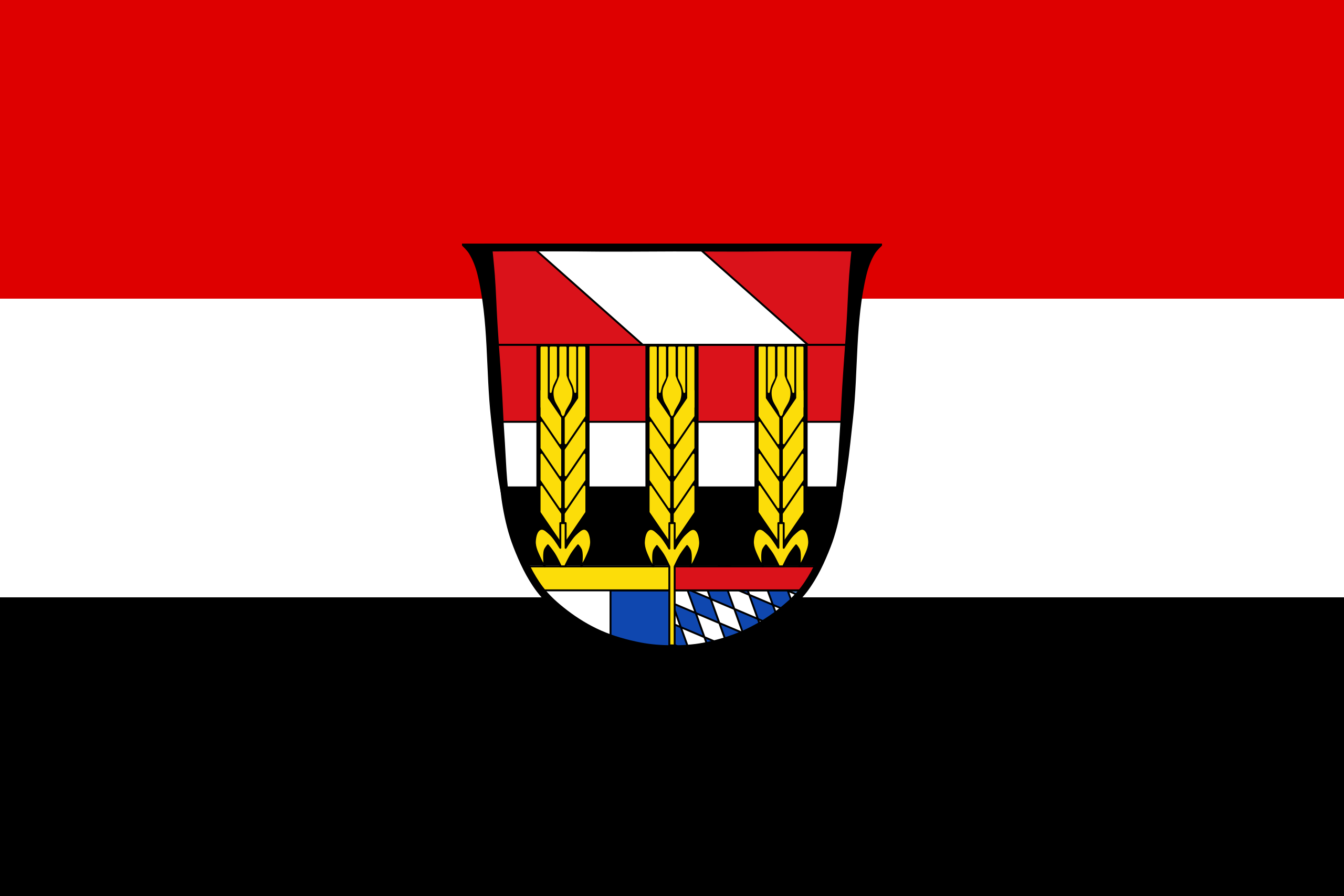
- Flag Coat of arms

- Location of Hohenburg within Amberg-Sulzbach district
- Interactive map of Hohenburg
- Location within Germany Location within Bavaria
- Coordinates: 49°18′N 11°48′E
- Country: Germany
- State: Bavaria
- Admin. region: Oberpfalz
- District: Amberg-Sulzbach

Government
  - Mayor (2020–26): Florian Junkes (CSU)

Area
  - Total: 41.49 km^{2} (16.02 sq mi)
- Elevation: 389 m (1,276 ft)

Population (2025-12-31)
  - Total: 1,815
  - Density: 43.75/km^{2} (113.3/sq mi)
- Time zone: UTC+01:00 (CET)
  - Summer (DST): UTC+02:00 (CEST)
- Postal codes: 92277
- Dialling codes: 09626
- Vehicle registration: AS
- Website: www.hohenburg.de

Hohenburg (German pronunciation: [ˈhoːənbʊʁk]) is a municipality in the district of Amberg-Sulzbach in Bavaria in Germany.

== Geography ==
Apart from Hohenburg the municipality consists of the following villages:

- Adertshausen
- Aicha
- Allersburg
- Allertshofen
- Berghausen
- Egelsheim
- Friebertsheim
- Hammermühle
- Köstl
- Köstlöd
- Lammerthal
- Lohe
- Malsbach
- Mendorferbuch
- Ödenwöhr
- Ransbach
- Schwarzmühle
- Spieshof
- Sternfall
- Stettkirchen
- Voggenhof
- Weihermühle
