= Hirschbach, Bavaria =

Hirschbach
- Municipality
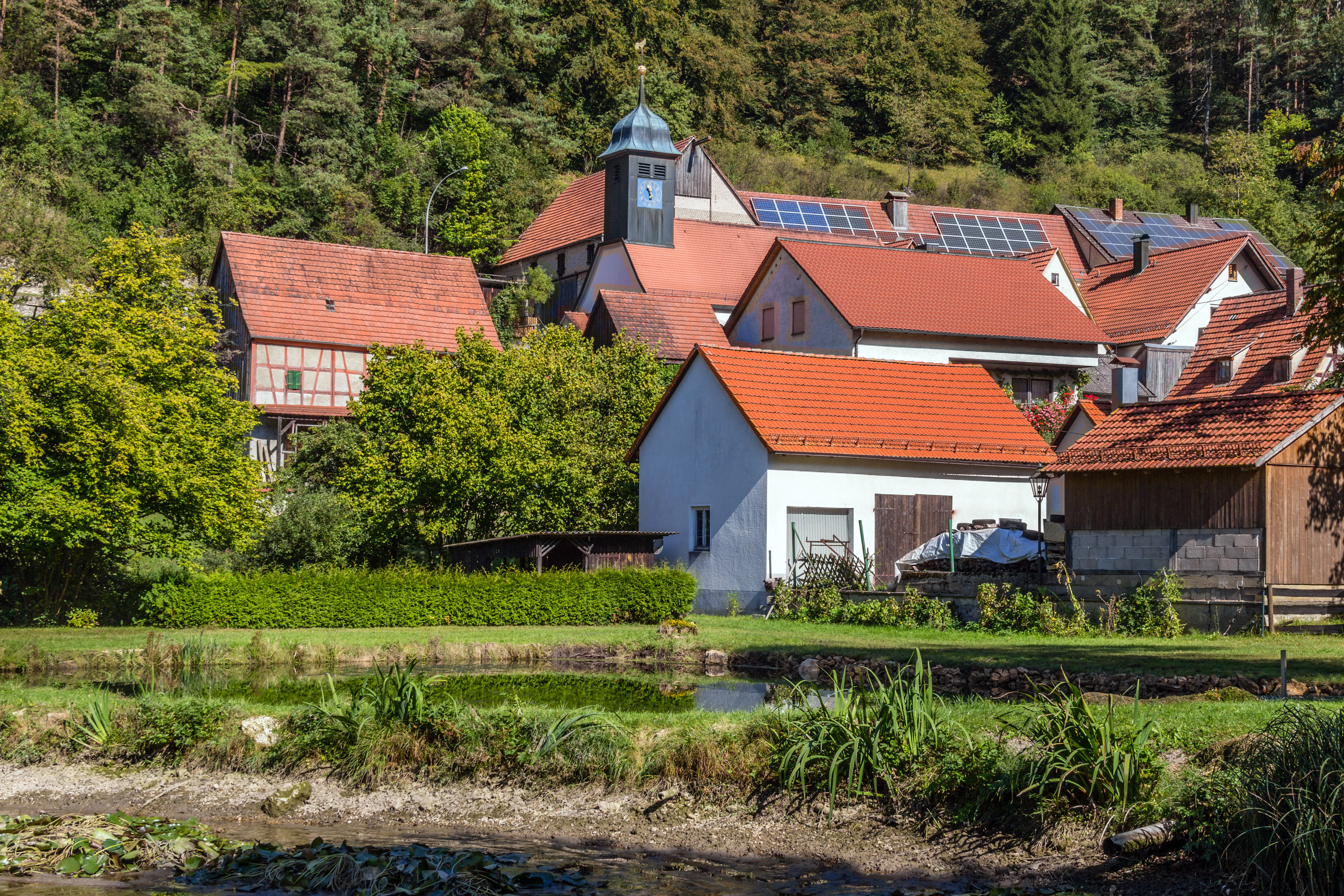
- Center of Hirschbach with the chapel

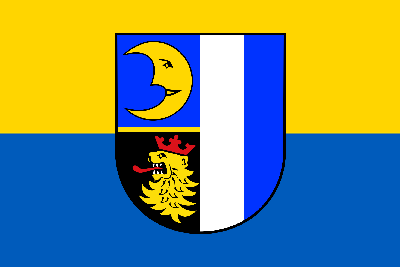
- Flag Coat of arms

- Location of Hirschbach within Amberg-Sulzbach district
- Interactive map of Hirschbach
- Location within Germany Location within Bavaria
- Coordinates: 49°33′N 11°32′E
- Country: Germany
- State: Bavaria
- Admin. region: Oberpfalz
- District: Amberg-Sulzbach
- Municipal assoc.: Königstein

Government
  - Mayor (2020–26): Hermann Mertel

Area
  - Total: 31.03 km^{2} (11.98 sq mi)
- Elevation: 390 m (1,280 ft)

Population (2025-12-31)
  - Total: 1,178
  - Density: 37.96/km^{2} (98.32/sq mi)
- Time zone: UTC+01:00 (CET)
  - Summer (DST): UTC+02:00 (CEST)
- Postal codes: 92275
- Dialling codes: 09665
- Vehicle registration: AS
- Website: www.gemeinde-hirschbach.de

Hirschbach (German pronunciation: [ˈhɪʁʃbax]) is a municipality in the district of Amberg-Sulzbach in Bavaria in Germany.

== Geography ==
Apart from Hirschbach the municipality consists of the following villages:

- Buchhof
- Eggenberg
- Eschenfelden
- Jägersruh
- München
- Oberachtel
- Oberklausen
- Obermühle
- Pruppach
- Ratzenhof
- Riglashof
- Rinnenbrunn
- Stoffelmühle
- Unterachtel
- Unterklausen
- Ziegelhütte b.Achtel

== Prototype grandstand in Achtel ==
The small village of Achtel in Hirschbach is the site of a disused sports grandstand constructed as a prototype for part of the planned Deutsches Stadion in Nuremberg, which Hitler had planned as to be used as a venue for all Olympic Games subsequent to a Nazi victory in World War II. It is now in a state of disrepair.
