= Hahnbach =

- Municipality
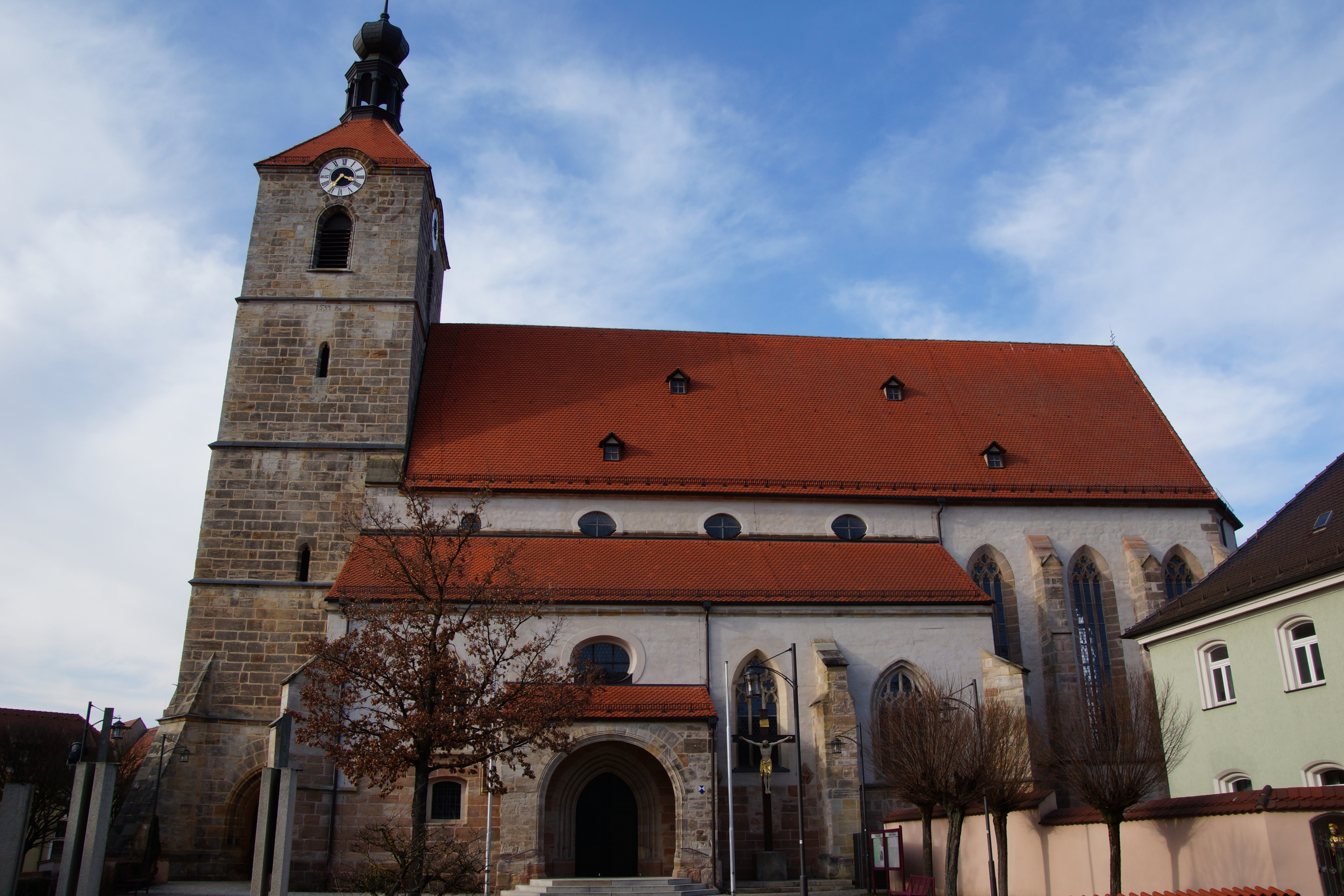
- Church of Saint James

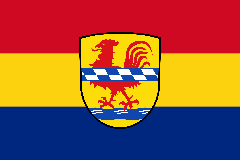
- Flag Coat of arms

- Location of Hahnbach within Amberg-Sulzbach district
- Interactive map of Hahnbach
- Location within Germany Location within Bavaria
- Coordinates: 49°31′N 11°48′E
- Country: Germany
- State: Bavaria
- Admin. region: Oberpfalz
- District: Amberg-Sulzbach
- Municipal assoc.: Hahnbach
- Subdivisions: 24 Gemeindeteile

Government
  - Mayor (2020–26): Bernhard Lindner (CSU)

Area
  - Total: 67.38 km^{2} (26.02 sq mi)
- Elevation: 386 m (1,266 ft)

Population (2025-12-31)
  - Total: 4,964
  - Density: 73.67/km^{2} (190.8/sq mi)
- Time zone: UTC+01:00 (CET)
  - Summer (DST): UTC+02:00 (CEST)
- Postal codes: 92256
- Dialling codes: 09664
- Vehicle registration: AS
- Website: www.hahnbach.de

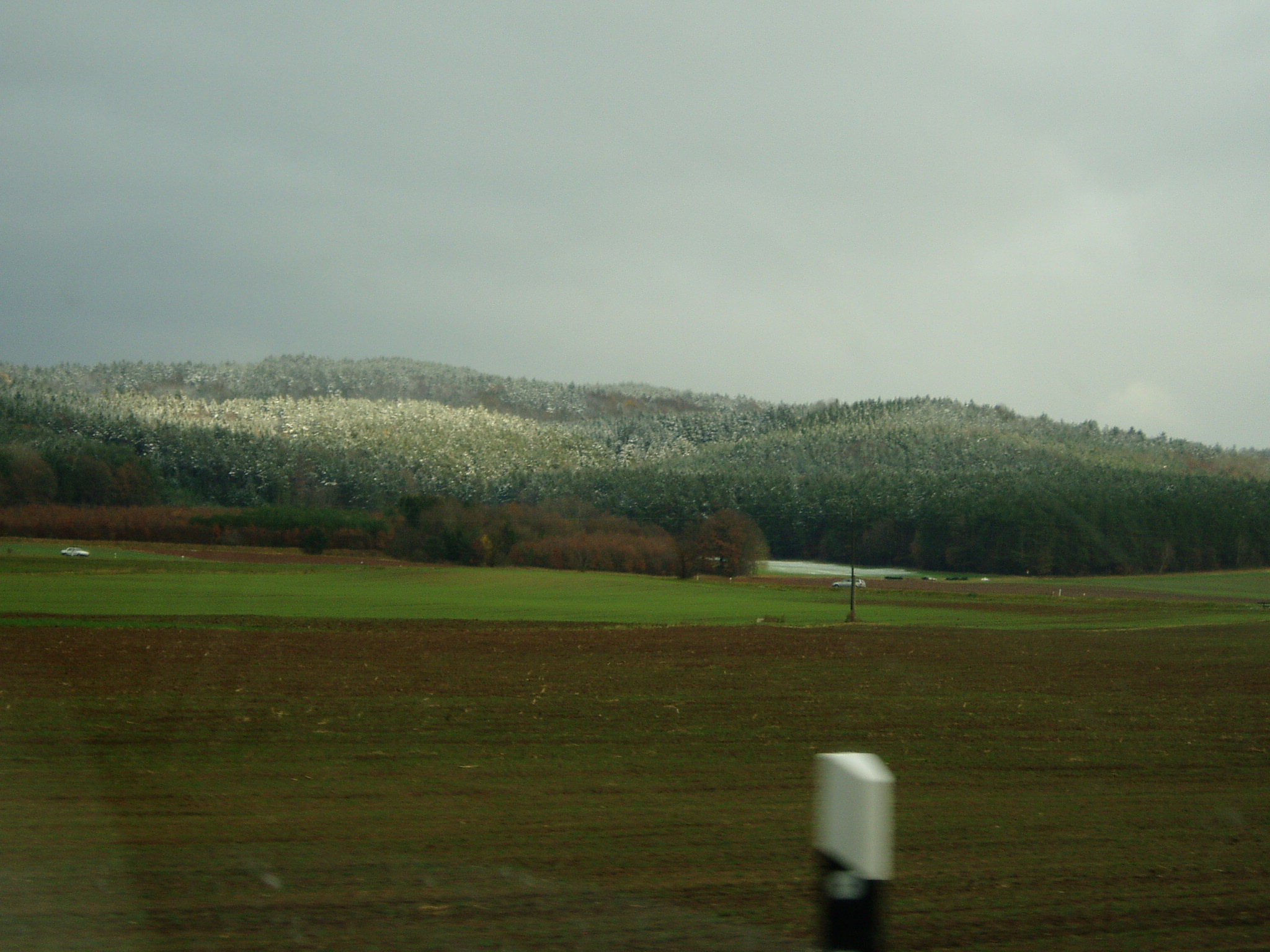

Hahnbach (German pronunciation: [ˈhaːnbax]) is a municipality in the district of Amberg-Sulzbach in Bavaria in Germany. There are living at the moment about 5000 people. The most important districts are: Fronbergsiedlung, Friedhofsiedlung, Süd 3, Markt. About 2000 of the 5000 people are not living in Hahnbach by itself, they are living in villages like Dürnsricht or Iber, which are in the area of Hahnbach. SSince 2014, the Mayor of Hahnbach is Bernhard Lindner (CSU). The CSU is the most popular party in Hahnbach, at the last election they got more than 75% of the votes, at place two was the SPD with at least 20% of the votes. The most important objects of interest are the Amberger Tor and the Fahrraddenkmal, which shows a biker holding his bike. The church in Hahnbach is called St. Jakobus Church. The sports team is called SV Hahnbach.

== Geography ==
Apart from Hahnbach the municipality consists of the following villages:

- Adlholz
- Dürnsricht
- Frohnberg
- Frohnhof
- Godlricht
- Hahnbach
- Höhengau
- Iber
- Irlbach
- Kienlohe
- Kötzersricht
- Kreuzberg
- Kümmersbuch
- Laubhof
- Luppersricht
- Mausdorf
- Mimbach
- Mülles
- Oberschalkenbach
- Ölhof
- Pickenricht
- Schalkenthan
- Süß
- Unterschalkenbach
- Ursulapoppenricht
- Wüstenau
- Wüstenaumühle

== Notable people ==
People born in Hahnbach:

- Andreas Raselius (1530 - 1575), German renaissance composer
- Daniel Siegert (born 1991), German child singer, first winner of German version of Star Search
