= Gebenbach =

- Municipality
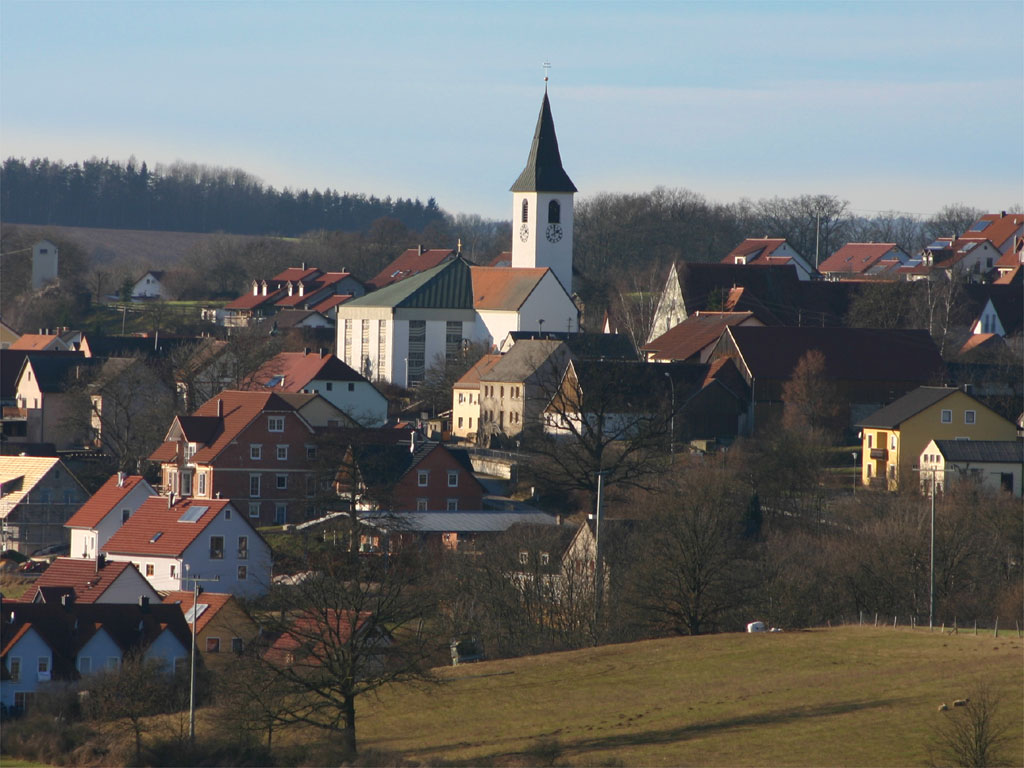
- Gebenbach

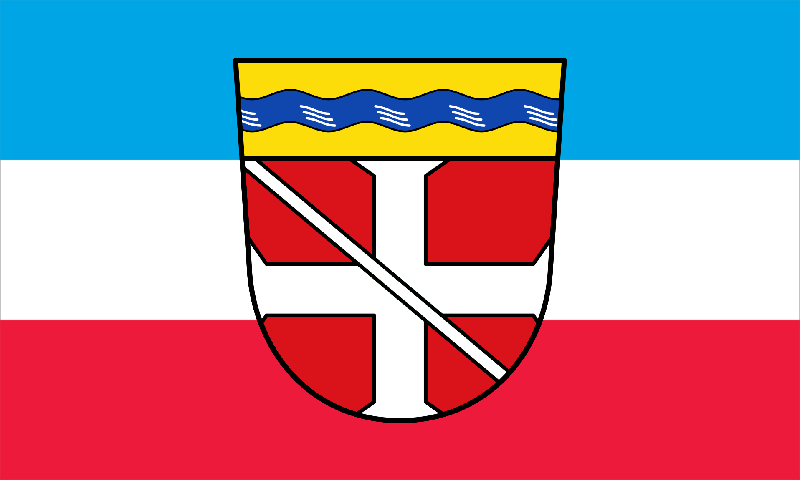
- Flag Coat of arms

- Location of Gebenbach within Amberg-Sulzbach district
- Interactive map of Gebenbach
- Location within Germany Location within Bavaria
- Coordinates: 49°28′N 11°53′E
- Country: Germany
- State: Bavaria
- Admin. region: Oberpfalz
- District: Amberg-Sulzbach
- Municipal assoc.: Hahnbach

Government
  - Mayor (2020–26): Peter Dotzler (FW)

Area
  - Total: 18.13 km^{2} (7.00 sq mi)
- Elevation: 448 m (1,470 ft)

Population (2025-12-31)
  - Total: 829
  - Density: 45.7/km^{2} (118/sq mi)
- Time zone: UTC+01:00 (CET)
  - Summer (DST): UTC+02:00 (CEST)
- Postal codes: 92274
- Dialling codes: 09622
- Vehicle registration: AS
- Website: www.gebenbach.de

Gebenbach (German pronunciation: [ˈɡeːbn̩bax]) is a municipality in the district of Amberg-Sulzbach in Bavaria in Germany.

== Geography ==
Apart from Gebenbach the municipality consists of the following villages:

- Atzmannsricht
- Kainsricht
