= Briefzentrum (Deutsche Post) =

A Briefzentrum (English: Letter center) is a district center for the processing of letters for Deutsche Post.

== History ==
Before 1993, there were more than 1,000 centers for the processing of letters.

After the introduction of the new postal codes in Germany, 83 different district centers were built between 1994 and 1998. In 2003, Briefzentrum 42 (Wuppertal) was closed. After which, there have only been 82 district processing centers.

== Size ==
The processing centers are organized by size, which is determined by the number of letters processed daily:

- S: 450,000–750,000
- M: 750,000–1,500,000
- L: 1,500,000–2,250,000
- XL: 2,250,000–3,000,000
- XXL: 3,000,000–4,500,000
- IPZ: 3,000,000–5,000,000 (International Center)

== List of letter processing centers ==
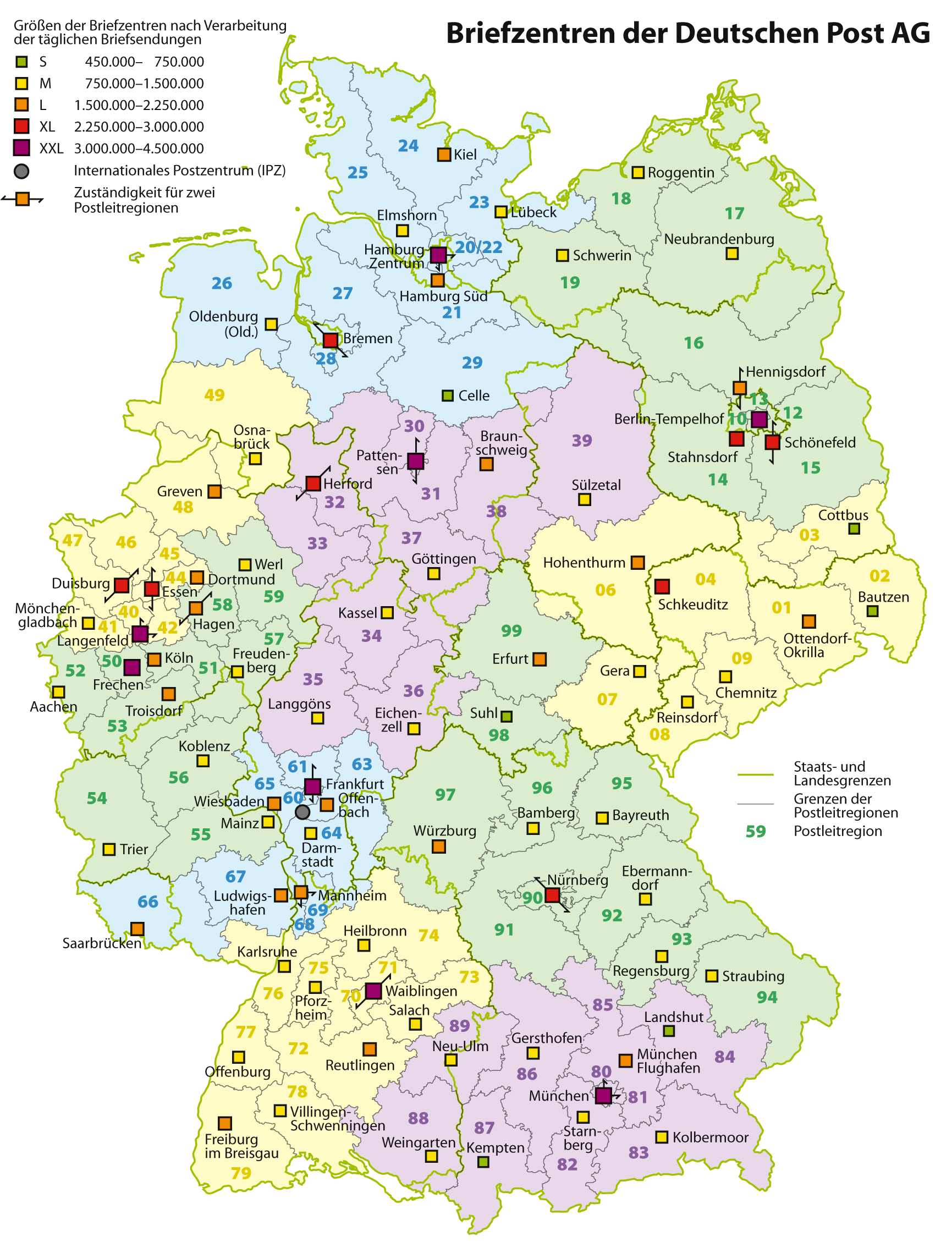
Map with letter processing centers in Germany

Postal Code	Region	Location of Center	Size	Operational Since
01	Dresden	Ottendorf-Okrilla	L	1996
02	Bautzen	Bautzen	S	1996
03	Cottbus	Cottbus	S	1998
04	Leipzig	Schkeuditz	XL	1996
06	Halle (Saale)	Hohenthurm	L	1995
07	Gera	Gera	M	1997
08	Zwickau	Reinsdorf	M	1997
09	Chemnitz	Chemnitz	M	1995
10	Berlin-Zentrum	Berlin-Tempelhof	XXL	1997
12/ 15	Berlin-Südost	Schönefeld	XL	1996
13/ 16	Berlin-Nord	Hennigsdorf	L	1996
14	Berlin-Südwest	Stahnsdorf	XL	1996
17	Neubrandenburg	Neubrandenburg	M	1998
18	Rostock	Roggentin	M	1996
19	Schwerin	Schwerin	M	1997
20/ 22	Hamburg-Zentrum	Hamburg	XXL	1997
21	Hamburg-Süd	Hamburg	L	1996
23	Lübeck	Lübeck	M	1996
24	Kiel	Kiel	L	1996
25	Elmshorn	Elmshorn	M	1997
26	Oldenburg	Oldenburg	M	1997
27/ 28	Bremen	Bremen	XL	1996
29	Celle	Celle	S	1997
30/ 31	Hannover	Pattensen	XXL	1996
32/ 33	Herford	Herford	XL	1996
34	Kassel	Kassel	M	1995
35	Gießen	Langgöns	M	1997
36	Fulda	Eichenzell	M	1998
37	Göttingen	Göttingen	M	1997
38	Braunschweig	Braunschweig	L	1996
39	Magdeburg	Sülzetal	M	1996
40	Düsseldorf	Langenfeld	XXL	1997
41	Mönchengladbach	Mönchengladbach	M	1996
42	Wuppertal	Wuppertal	L	1998–2003
44	Dortmund	Dortmund	L	1997
45	Essen	Essen	XL	1997
46/ 47	Duisburg	Duisburg	XL	1996
48	Münster	Greven	L	1994
49	Osnabrück	Osnabrück	M	1996
50	Köln-West	Frechen	XXL	1997
51	Köln-Ost	Köln	L	1996
52	Aachen	Aachen	M	1996
53	Bonn	Troisdorf	L	1996
54	Trier	Trier	M	1998
55	Mainz	Mainz-Hechtsheim	M	1998
56	Koblenz	Koblenz	M	1996
57	Siegen	Freudenberg	M	1998
58	Hagen	Hagen	L	1997
59	Hamm	Werl	M	1997
60/ 61	Frankfurt am Main	Frankfurt am Main	XXL	1996
62	Frankfurt am Main	Flughafen Frankfurt am Main	IPZ	1997
63	Offenbach am Main	Offenbach am Main	L	1997
64	Darmstadt	Darmstadt	M	1998
65	Wiesbaden	Mainz-Kastel	L	1996
66	Saarbrücken	Saarbrücken	L	1996
67	Ludwigshafen	Ludwigshafen	L	1997
68/ 69	Mannheim	Mannheim-Käfertal	L	1996
70/ 71	Stuttgart	Waiblingen	XXL	1997
72	Reutlingen	Reutlingen	L	1997
73	Göppingen	Salach	M	1997
74	Heilbronn	Heilbronn	M	1997
75	Pforzheim	Pforzheim	M	1998
76	Karlsruhe	Karlsruhe	M	1996
77	Offenburg	Offenburg	M	1998
78	Villingen-Schwenningen	Villingen-Schwenningen	M	1997
79	Freiburg im Breisgau	Freiburg im Breisgau	L	1996
80/ 81	München	München	XXL	1998
82	Starnberg	Starnberg	M	1998
83	Rosenheim	Kolbermoor	M	1998
84	Landshut	Landshut	S	1998
85	Freising	Flughafen-München	L	1998
86	Augsburg	Gersthofen	M	1996
87	Kempten	Kempten	S	1998
88	Ravensburg	Weingarten	L (M)	2010 (M from 1997-May 2010)
89	Ulm	Neu-Ulm	M	1998
90/ 91	Nürnberg	Nürnberg	XXL	1997
92	Amberg	Ebermannsdorf	M	1996
93	Regensburg	Regensburg	M	1998
94	Straubing	Straubing	M	1994
95	Bayreuth	Bayreuth	M	1996
96	Bamberg	Bamberg	M	1997
97	Würzburg	Würzburg	L	1996
98	Suhl	Suhl	S	1998
99	Erfurt	Erfurt	L	1996
