= Königstein =

Königstein (German pronunciation: [ˈkøːniçʃtaɪn] or [ˈkøːnikʃtaɪn]) may refer to:

== Germany ==
- Königstein im Taunus, a town in Hesse
- Königstein, Saxony
- Königstein Fortress, near Königstein, Saxony
- Königstein (hill), an elevation on which the fortress sits
- Königstein, Bavaria
- Königstein (Westerhausen), a hill near Westerhausen, Saxony-Anhalt
- Königstein Railway

== Namibia ==
- Königstein, Namibia, highest mountain in Namibia

== Romania ==
- Piatra Craiului Mountains, called Königstein by local Germans (Transylvanian Saxons)
