= Neukirchen bei Sulzbach-Rosenberg =

Neukirchen b.Sulzbach-Rosenberg
- Municipality
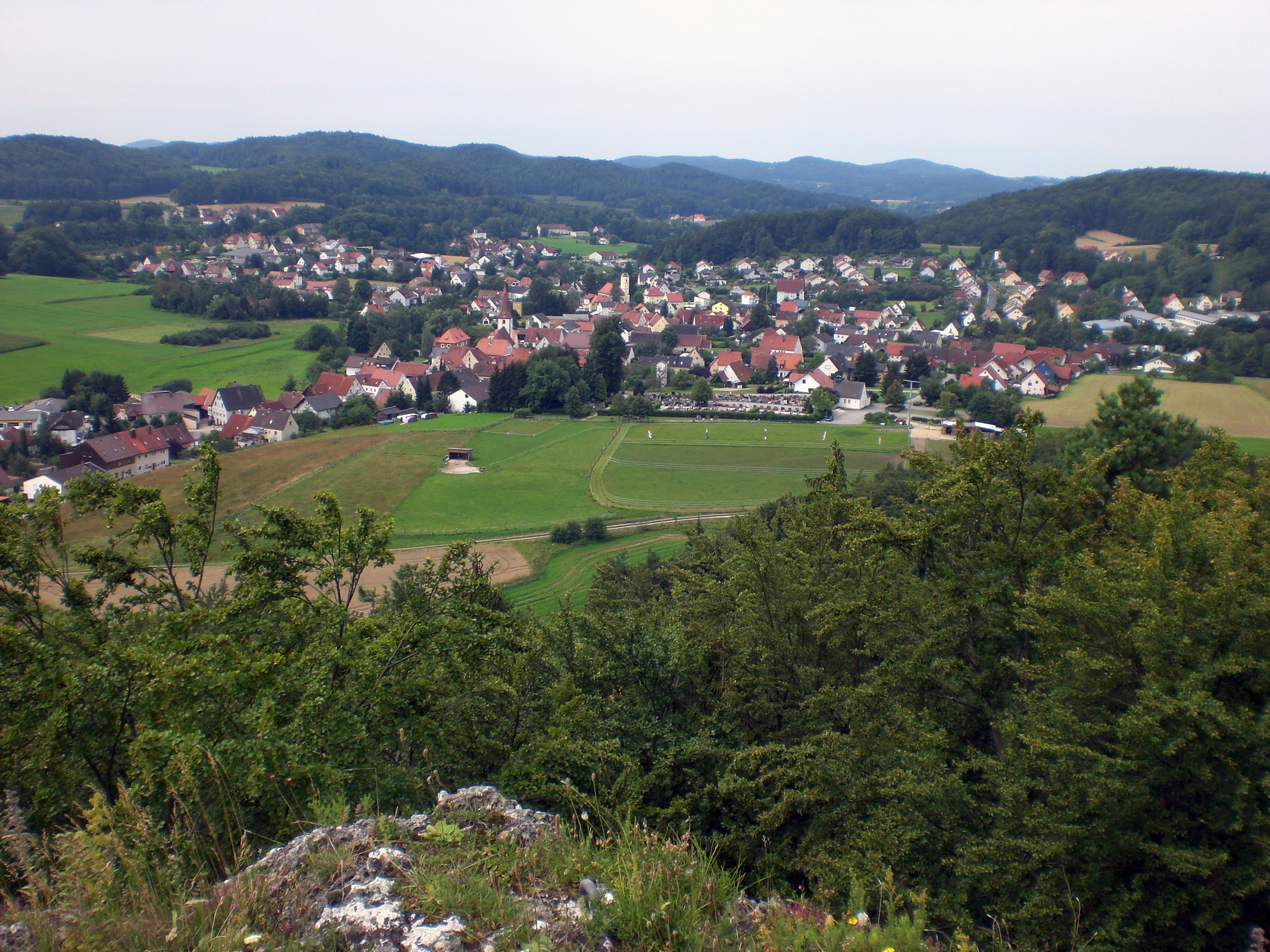
- Neukirchen bei Sulzbach-Rosenberg

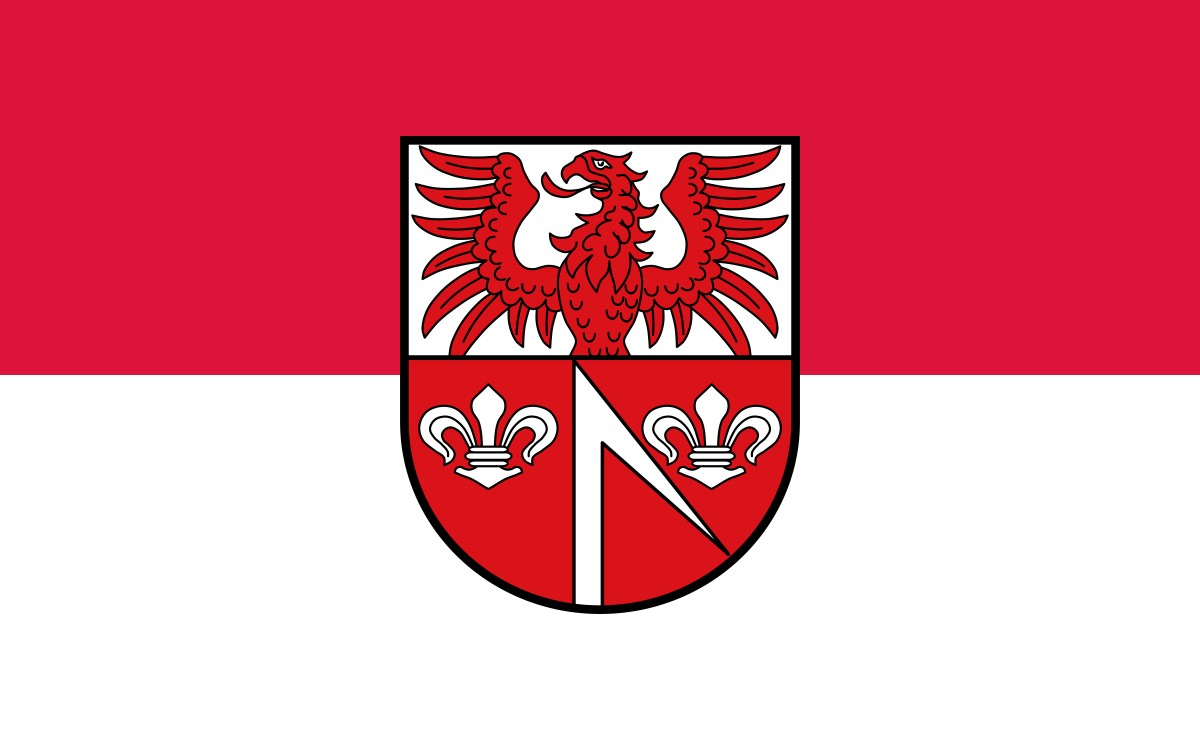
- Flag Coat of arms

- Location of Neukirchen b.Sulzbach-Rosenberg within Amberg-Sulzbach district
- Interactive map of Neukirchen b.Sulzbach-Rosenberg
- Location within Germany Location within Bavaria
- Coordinates: 49°32′N 11°38′E
- Country: Germany
- State: Bavaria
- Admin. region: Oberpfalz
- District: Amberg-Sulzbach
- Municipal assoc.: Neukirchen bei Sulzbach-Rosenberg

Government
  - Mayor (2020–26): Peter Achatzi (CSU)

Area
  - Total: 45.76 km^{2} (17.67 sq mi)
- Elevation: 420–650 m (1,380–2,130 ft)

Population (2025-12-31)
  - Total: 2,495
  - Density: 54.52/km^{2} (141.2/sq mi)
- Time zone: UTC+01:00 (CET)
  - Summer (DST): UTC+02:00 (CEST)
- Postal codes: 92259
- Dialling codes: 09663
- Vehicle registration: AS
- Website: www.neukirchen-bei-sulzbach-rosenberg.de

Neukirchen bei Sulzbach-Rosenberg (German pronunciation: [nɔʏˈkɪʁçn̩ baɪ ˈzʊltsbax ˈʁoːzn̩bɛʁk], lit. 'Neukirchen near Sulzbach-Rosenberg') is a municipality in the district of Amberg-Sulzbach in Bavaria in Germany.

== Geography ==
Apart from Neukirchen the municipality consists of the following villages:

- Blechhof
- Büchelberg
- Eckenricht
- Einzelhof
- Erkelsdorf
- Ermhof
- Fichtelbrunn
- Föderricht
- Fromberg
- Gaisheim
- Grasberg
- Habres
- Haghof
- Haid
- Högberg
- Holnstein
- Hundheim
- Hundsboden
- Knappenberg
- Lockenricht
- Mirtelhof
- Mittelreinbach
- Neukirchen b.Sulzbach-Rosenberg
- Oberlangenfeld
- Obermainshof
- Oberreinbach
- Peilstein
- Pfeilstein
- Pilgramshof
- Rittmannshof
- Röckenricht
- Schönlind
- Stegerhof
- Steinbach
- Trondorf
- Truisdorf
- Waldlust
