= Anton Lindner =

German World War II fighter pilot (1917–1994)

- Born: 12 April 1917; Hohenkemnath
- Died: 17 February 1994 (aged 76); Hohenkemnath
- Military career
- Allegiance: Nazi Germany (to 1945); West Germany
- Branch: Luftwaffe; German Air Force
- Service years: 1939–1945; 1956–1972
- Rank: Oberleutnant (Wehrmacht); Oberstleutnant (Bundeswehr)
- Unit: JG 51
- Conflicts: World War II: Battle of France; Operation Barbarossa; Battle of Kursk; Defense of the Reich
- Awards: Knight's Cross of the Iron Cross

Anton Lindner (12 April 1917 – 17 February 1994) was a Luftwaffe ace and recipient of the Knight's Cross of the Iron Cross during World War II. The Knight's Cross of the Iron Cross, and its variants were the highest awards in the military and paramilitary forces of Nazi Germany during World War II. Lindner joined the postwar German Air Force, at the time named the Bundesluftwaffe, in 1956 and retired in 1972 as an Oberstleutnant (colonel). During his career he was credited with 73 aerial victories, one on the Western Front and 72 on the Eastern Front, claimed in 650 combat missions.

== Early life and career ==
Lindner was born on 12 April 1917 in Hohenkemnath, present-day part of Ursensollen, then in Kingdom of Bavaria within the German Empire.

== World War II ==
On 24 May 1940, Linder was shot down and wounded in aerial combat with Royal Air Force Supermarine Spitfire fighters. He successfully bailed out of his Messerschmitt Bf 109 E near Calais.

On 8 April 1945, Lindner was appointed Staffelkapitän (squadron leader) of the Stabsstaffel (headquarters squadron) of JG 51. (Note: In early October 1942, II. Gruppe of JG 51 had been withdrawn from the Eastern Front and sent to Jesau, near present-day Bagrationovsk, to Heiligenbeil, present-day Mamonovo, to be reequipped with the Focke-Wulf Fw 190 A. While undergoing training on this aircraft, the Gruppe received orders on 4 November to transfer to the Mediterranean theatre flying the Messerschmitt Bf 109 again. 6. Staffel had been exempt from this order, was detached from II. Gruppe, and continued its training on the Fw 190. In late November, 6. Staffel was renamed to Stabsstaffel (headquarters squadron) of JG 51. Alternatively, the Stabsstaffel was also referred to as Geschwaderstabsstaffel z.b.V., roughly translating to fighter wing squadron for special deployment'. The abbreviation z. b. V. is German and stands for zur besonderen Verwendung (for special deployment).) He succeeded Leutnant Wilhelm Hübner who had been killed in action. On 24 April, Lindner was also placed in command of 15. Staffel of JG 51, succeeding Hauptmann Helmut Scheuber. Lindner held both command positions until the end of World War II in Europe.

== Later life ==
Following World War II, Lindner reentered military service in the West German Air Force, at the time referred to as the Bundesluftwaffe. He retired in March 1972 holding the rank of Oberstleutnant (lieutenant colonel) and died on 17 February 1994 at the age of 76 in Hohenkemnath, Germany.

== Summary of career ==
=== Aerial victory claims ===
According to US historian David T. Zabecki, Lindner was credited with 73 aerial victories. Spick also lists him with 73 aerial victories, 72 of which on the Eastern Front and one on the Western Front, claimed in 650 combat mission. Mathews and Foreman, authors of Luftwaffe Aces — Biographies and Victory Claims, researched the German Federal Archives and state that Lindner was credited with approximately 72 aerial victories on the Eastern Front, plus one further unconfirmed claim on the Western Front.

Victory claims were logged to a map-reference (PQ = Planquadrat), for example "PQ 56441". The Luftwaffe grid map (Jägermeldenetz) covered all of Europe, western Russia and North Africa and was composed of rectangles measuring 15 minutes of latitude by 30 minutes of longitude, an area of about 360 square miles (930 km^{2}). These sectors were then subdivided into 36 smaller units to give a location area 3 km × 4 km (1.9 mi × 2.5 mi) in size.

Chronicle of aerial victories
This and the ? (question mark) indicates information discrepancies listed by Prien, Stemmer, Rodeike, Bock, Mathews and Foreman.
Claim	Date	Time	Type	Location	Claim	Date	Time	Type	Location
– 2. Staffel of Jagdgeschwader 51 – Operation Barbarossa — 22 June – 5 December 1941
1	23 June 1941	13:04	R-3		6	27 July 1941	18:45	I-16	
2	29 June 1941	18:08	SB-2		7	6 September 1941	17:10	I-16	
3	2 July 1941	14:18	DB-3		8	6 October 1941	10:05	Pe-2	
4	10 July 1941	18:56	V-11		9	6 October 1941	13:03	Pe-2	
5	24 July 1941	12:03	V-11						
– 2. Staffel of Jagdgeschwader 51 "Mölders" – Eastern Front — 6 December 1941 – 30 April 1942
10	7 March 1942	10:52	I-16		11	1 April 1942	11:40	I-61 (MiG-3)	
– 2. Staffel of Jagdgeschwader 51 "Mölders" – Eastern Front — 1 May 1942 – 3 February 1943
12	6 July 1942	19:35	Pe-2		16	8 December 1942	13:12	MiG-3	vicinity of Dubrovka
13	29 October 1942	13:45	P-40	over Volokolamsk	17	17 December 1942? (Note: According to Mathews and Foreman claimed on 29 December 1942.)	13:50	Pe-2	PQ 56441; 30 km (19 mi) west-northwest of Mozhaysk
14	4 December 1942	08:16	P-40	25 km (16 mi) northwest of Rzhev	18	15 January 1943	12:43	MiG-3	PQ 07653
15	8 December 1942	13:08	MiG-3	vicinity of Rodsselja					
– 2. Staffel of Jagdgeschwader 51 "Mölders" – Eastern Front — 4 February – 31 December 1943
19	23 January 1943	07:34	Pe-2	PQ 35 Ost 64533; 20 km (12 mi) northeast of Telchje	41	15 August 1943	10:30	Il-2 m.H. (Note: The "m.H." refers to an Ilyushin Il-2 with rear gunner (mit Heckschütze).)	PQ 35 Ost 51859; 15 km (9.3 mi) east of Bohodukhiv
20	23 January 1943	08:16	Pe-2? (Note: According to Mathews and Foreman claimed as an Ilyushin Il-2.)	PQ 35 Ost 63254; 15 km (9.3 mi) southeast of Zalegoshch	42	19 August 1943	14:00	Il-2 m.H.	east of Liubotyn
21	24 January 1943	06:58	Il-2	PQ 35 Ost 44233; 25 km (16 mi) north-northeast of Zhizdra	43	22 August 1943	06:22	Il-2 m.H.	Meragatschij; Dergatsch
22	24 January 1943	07:04	Il-2	PQ 35 Ost 44251; 15 km (9.3 mi) north of Zhizdra	44	22 August 1943	06:59	Yak-1	northeast of Liubotyn
23	26 July 1943	10:23	La-5	PQ 35 Ost 63129; 10 km (6.2 mi) east of Oryol	45	23 August 1943	11:57	LaGG-3	northeast of Juchnyi
24	26 July 1943	10:40	Il-2 m.H.	PQ 35 Ost 63142; 10 km (6.2 mi) south of Oryol	46	23 August 1943	12.08	LaGG-3	Danilovka
25	28 July 1943	18:15	LaGG-3	PQ 35 Ost 63395; 15 km (9.3 mi) north-northwest of Maloarkhangelsk	47	29 August 1943	08:49	LaGG-3	Kruschenschow
26	29 July 1943	16:38	Il-2 m.H.	PQ 35 Ost 54648, southwest of Bolkhov; 20 km (12 mi) northeast of Znamenskoye	48	29 August 1943	08:52	Il-2 m.H.	Golijuckowa; Artiyevovka
27? (Note: This claim is not listed by Mathews and Foreman.)	29 July 1943	19:01	Il-2	PQ 35 Ost 64127	49	29 August 1943	08:57	Il-2 m.H.	Golijuckowa; Artiyevovka
28	1 August 1943	10:14	La-5	PQ 35 Ost 54662; 10 km (6.2 mi) southwest of Belev	50	31 August 1943	12:40	La-5	west of Leonovo
29	1 August 1943	18:53	Il-2 m.H.	PQ 35 Ost 53475; 20 km (12 mi) southwest of Kromy	51	1 September 1943	12:40	La-5	east of Bolschaja-Lipnja
30	2 August 1943	11:44	LaGG-3	PQ 35 Ost 53454; 20 km (12 mi) southwest of Kromy	52	2 September 1943	10:53	LaGG-3	Yelnya
31	2 August 1943	11:52	Boston	PQ 35 Ost 53469; 5 km (3.1 mi) east of Kromy	53	2 September 1943	11:04	Il-2 m.H.	southwest of Leonovo
32	5 August 1943	09:07	LaGG-3	PQ 35 Ost 53446; 15 km (9.3 mi) south-southeast of Sockowo	54	7 September 1943	12:33	Il-2 m.H.	east of Mokroje
33	5 August 1943	14:15	LaGG-3	PQ 35 Ost 54725; 10 km (6.2 mi) west of Znamenskoye	55	14 September 1943	12:13	Pe-2	Shezkino
34	5 August 1943	17:12	Il-2 m.H.	PQ 35 Ost 54726; 10 km (6.2 mi) west of Znamenskoye	56	14 September 1943	16:39	La-5	Torshok
35	6 August 1943	12:17	Il-2 m.H.	PQ 35 Ost 44654; 20 km (12 mi) northeast of Bryansk	57	15 September 1943	17:16	Yak-1	Pjolki
36	6 August 1943	12:20	Il-2 m.H.	PQ 35 Ost 44687; 20 km (12 mi) east-northeast of Bryansk	58	15 September 1943	17:19	Il-2 m.H.	north of Yelnya
37	8 August 1943	08:04	Il-2 m.H.	PQ 35 Ost 54729; 10 km (6.2 mi) west of Znamenskoye	59	17 September 1943	10:43	Pe-2	south of Gluchow
38	8 August 1943	08:07	Il-2 m.H.	PQ 35 Ost 54731 vicinity of Znamenskoye	60?	18 September 1943	13:27	Yak-9	west of Yelnya
39	12 August 1943	06:14	La-5	PQ 35 Ost 51544 vicinity of Kirikowka	61	6 October 1943	12:09	LaGG-3	Budniza
40	14 August 1943	17:45	Il-2	northwest of Klenovo	62	25 October 1943	11:34	LaGG-3	Lojew

=== Awards ===
- Iron Cross (1939) 2nd and 1st Class
- German Cross in Gold on 27 May 1942 as Oberfeldwebel in the I./Jagdgeschwader 51
- Knight's Cross of the Iron Cross on 8 April 1944 as Leutnant and pilot in the Stabsstaffel/Jagdgeschwader 51 "Mölders" (Note: According to Scherzer as pilot in the I./Jagdgeschwader 51 "Mölders".)
