= Königstein, Bavaria =

Königstein
- Municipality
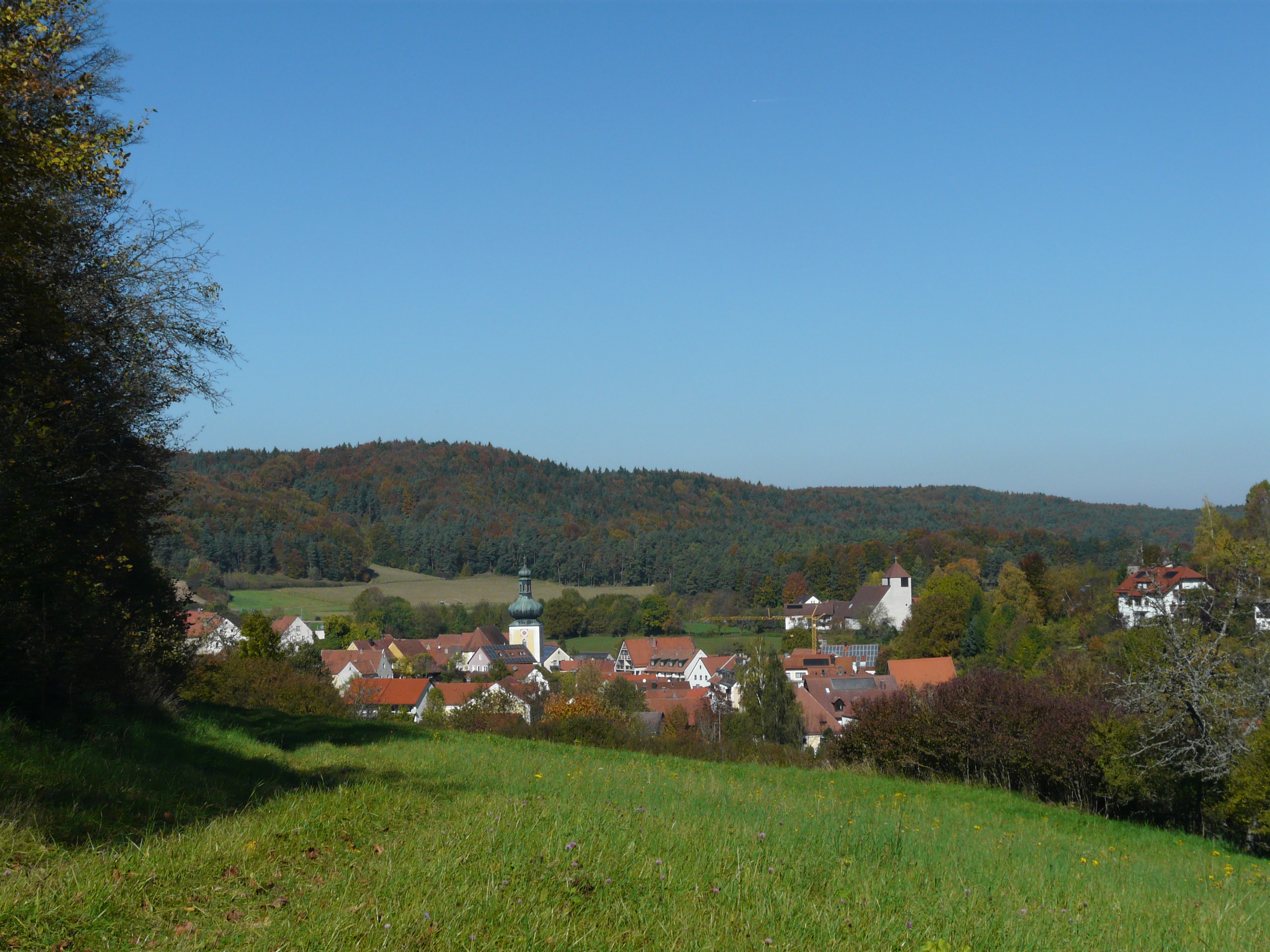
- View towards Königstein

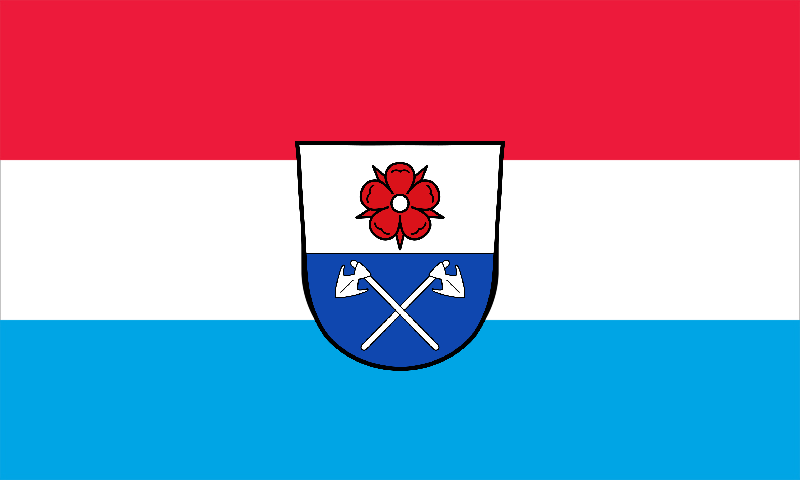
- Flag Coat of arms

- Location of Königstein within Amberg-Sulzbach district
- Interactive map of Königstein
- Location within Germany Location within Bavaria
- Coordinates: 49°36′26″N 11°38′00″E
- Country: Germany
- State: Bavaria
- Admin. region: Upper Palatinate
- District: Amberg-Sulzbach
- Municipal assoc.: Königstein

Government
  - Mayor (2022–28): Jörk Kaduk

Area
  - Total: 35.13 km^{2} (13.56 sq mi)
- Elevation: 490 m (1,610 ft)

Population (2025-12-31)
  - Total: 1,743
  - Density: 49.62/km^{2} (128.5/sq mi)
- Time zone: UTC+01:00 (CET)
  - Summer (DST): UTC+02:00 (CEST)
- Postal codes: 92281
- Dialling codes: 09665
- Vehicle registration: AS
- Website: www.markt-koenigstein.de

Königstein (German pronunciation: [ˈkøːniçʃtaɪn] or [ˈkøːnikʃtaɪn]), also referred to as Königstein (Oberpfalz) to distinguish it from other places named Königstein, is a market town in the Amberg-Sulzbach district, Bavaria, Germany. It is located 45 kilometres (28 mi) NE of Nuremberg.

== Geography ==
Apart from Königstein the municipality consists of the following villages:

- Bischofsreuth
- Breitenstein
- Döttenreuth
- Fichtenhof
- Funkenreuth
- Gaißach
- Hannesreuth
- Kürmreuth
- Loch
- Lunkenreuth
- Mitteldorf
- Mönlas
- Namsreuth
- Pruihausen
- Röslas
- Wildenhof
- Windmühle
- Ziegelhütte

== Points of interest ==
The Ossinger hill reaches 653 metres (2,142 ft) and is the second-highest hill in Upper Palatinate. There is a tower at the peak from which there are views of the surrounding Upper Palatinate and Franconian Jura countryside, as well as a hut that offers light refreshments.

Breitenstein Chapel is a two-story chapel situated on a rock out-cropping that dates from the second half of the 12th century. Common folk worshipped on the lower floor, while the nobility enjoyed the upper floor.

Golf Königstein is an 18-hole golf course.

The Königstein golf course is a par 72 spread out through the Oberpfalz countryside with views of the Oberpfalz Mountains on the front nine, and forest on the back nine. The course is located about 10 kilometers from the Vilseck Army Community.

Königstein is a tourist area frequented by Germans who enjoy "wandering" or long walks through the countryside. Also horseback riding, golfing, rappelling, and mountain biking on the trails in the countryside. The village of Königstein has several restaurants serving a variety of German cuisine.

== Twinnings ==
- Königstein im Taunus, Hesse, Germany
- Königstein, Saxony, Germany
