= Weigendorf =

- Municipality
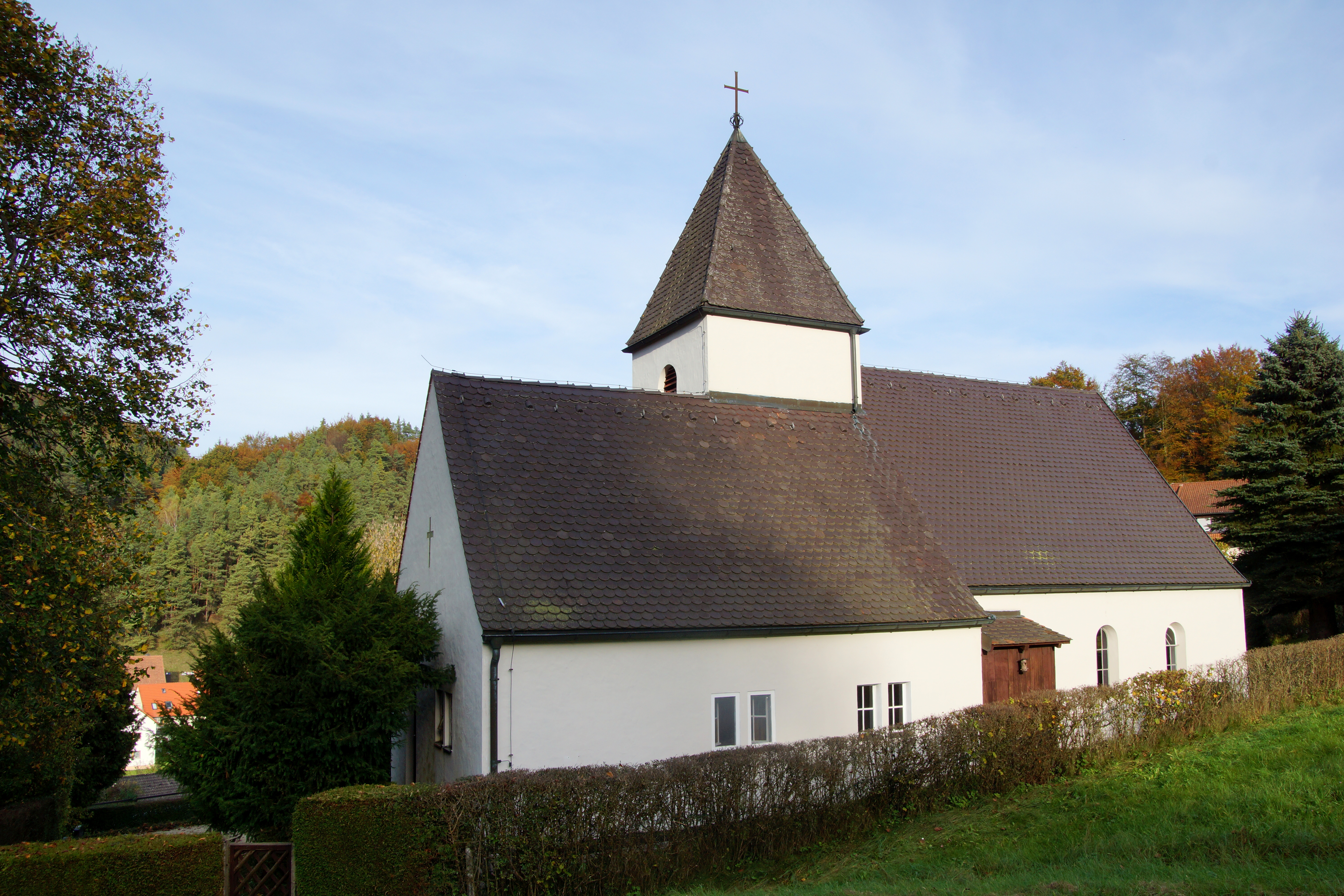
- Church of Saint John in Högen

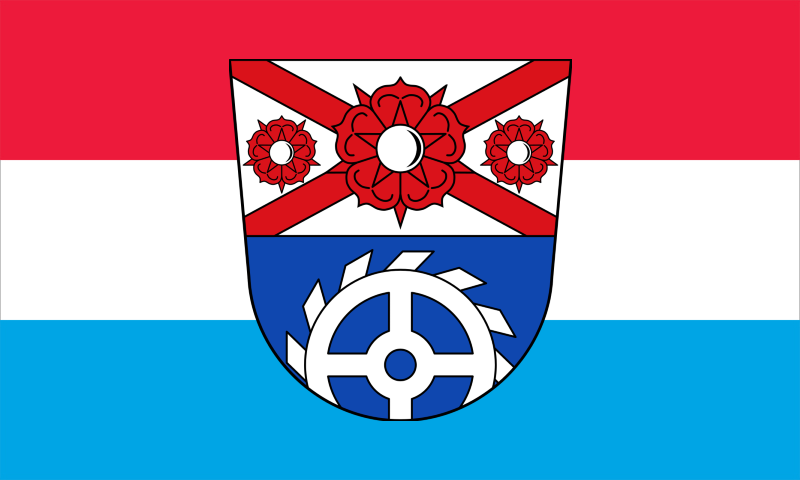
- Flag Coat of arms

- Location of Weigendorf within Amberg-Sulzbach district
- Interactive map of Weigendorf
- Location within Germany Location within Bavaria
- Coordinates: 49°30′N 11°34′E
- Country: Germany
- State: Bavaria
- Admin. region: Oberpfalz
- District: Amberg-Sulzbach
- Municipal assoc.: Neukirchen bei Sulzbach-Rosenberg

Government
  - Mayor (2020–26): Reiner Pickel (CSU)

Area
  - Total: 12.58 km^{2} (4.86 sq mi)
- Elevation: 375–552 m (1,230–1,811 ft)

Population (2025-12-31)
  - Total: 1,232
  - Density: 97.93/km^{2} (253.6/sq mi)
- Time zone: UTC+01:00 (CET)
  - Summer (DST): UTC+02:00 (CEST)
- Postal codes: 91249
- Dialling codes: 09154 / 09663
- Vehicle registration: AS
- Website: www.weigendorf.de

Weigendorf (German pronunciation: [ˈvaɪɡn̩dɔʁf]) is a municipality in the district of Amberg-Sulzbach in Bavaria in Germany.

== Geography ==
Apart from Weigendorf the municipality consists of the following villages:

- Breitenthal
- Deinsdorf
- Ernhüll
- Fallmühle
- Haunritz
- Heilbronntal
- Hellberg
- Högen
- Oed
- Unterlangenfeld
