= Ammerthal =

- Municipality
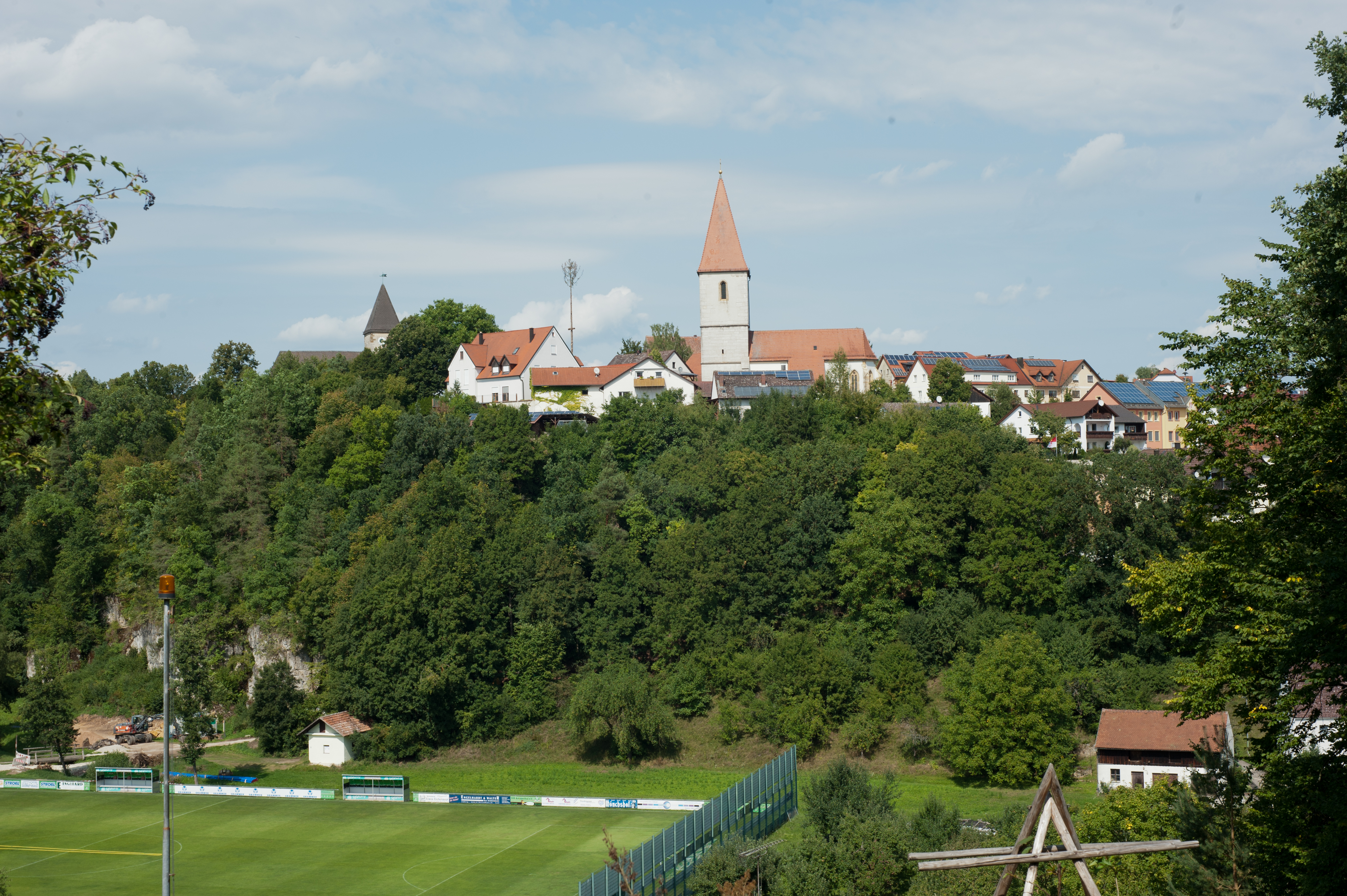

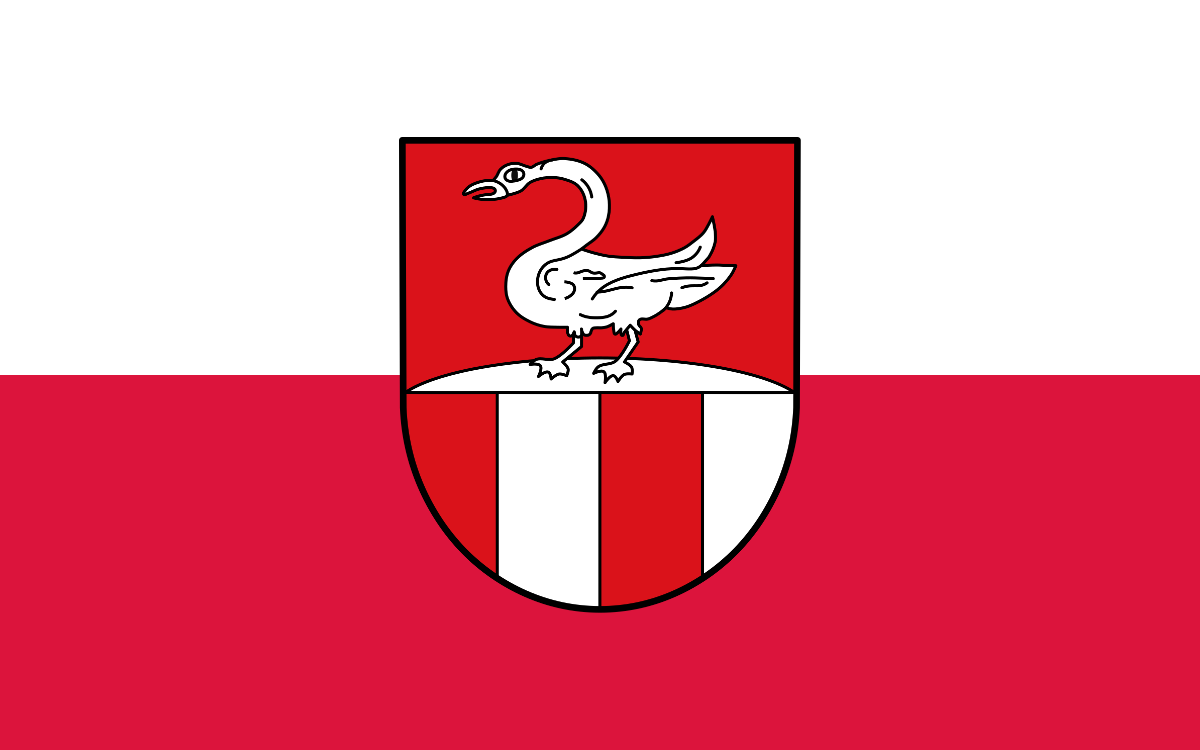
- Flag Coat of arms

- Location of Ammerthal within Amberg-Sulzbach district
- Interactive map of Ammerthal
- Location within Germany Location within Bavaria
- Coordinates: 49°26′N 11°45′E
- Country: Germany
- State: Bavaria
- Admin. region: Oberpfalz
- District: Amberg-Sulzbach

Government
  - Mayor (2020–26): Anton Peter (CSU)

Area
  - Total: 8.14 km^{2} (3.14 sq mi)
- Elevation: 430 m (1,410 ft)

Population (2025-12-31)
  - Total: 2,036
  - Density: 250/km^{2} (648/sq mi)
- Time zone: UTC+01:00 (CET)
  - Summer (DST): UTC+02:00 (CEST)
- Postal codes: 92260
- Dialling codes: 09628
- Vehicle registration: AS
- Website: www.ammerthal.de

Ammerthal is a municipality in the district of Amberg-Sulzbach in Bavaria in Germany.

== Geography ==
Apart from Ammerthal the municipality consists of the following four villages:

- Fichtenhof
- Finkenmühle
- Hirnmühle
- Viehberg

== Sport ==
The municipality's association football club DJK Ammerthal, formed in 1958, experienced its greatest success in 2012 when it won promotion to the Bayernliga for the first time.
