= Hahnbach (Verwaltungsgemeinschaft) =

- Verwaltungsgemeinschaft
- Location of Hahnbach within Amberg-Sulzbach district
- Interactive map of Hahnbach
- Location within Germany Location within Bavaria
- Coordinates: 49°32′N 11°48′E
- Country: Germany
- State: Bavaria
- Admin. region: Upper Palatinate
- District: Amberg-Sulzbach
- Seat: Hahnbach
- Subdivisions: 2 municipalities

Area
  - Total: 85.51 km^{2} (33.02 sq mi)

Population (2025-12-31)
  - Total: 5,793
  - Density: 67.75/km^{2} (175.5/sq mi)
- Time zone: UTC+01:00 (CET)
  - Summer (DST): UTC+02:00 (CEST)
- Website: www.hahnbach.de

Hahnbach is a Verwaltungsgemeinschaft (municipal association) in the district of Amberg-Sulzbach in Bavaria, Germany. Its seat is in Hahnbach. It consists of the following municipalities:

1. Gebenbach
2. Hahnbach
