= Electoral Palace, Amberg =

Coordinates: 49.442778°N 11.856667°E

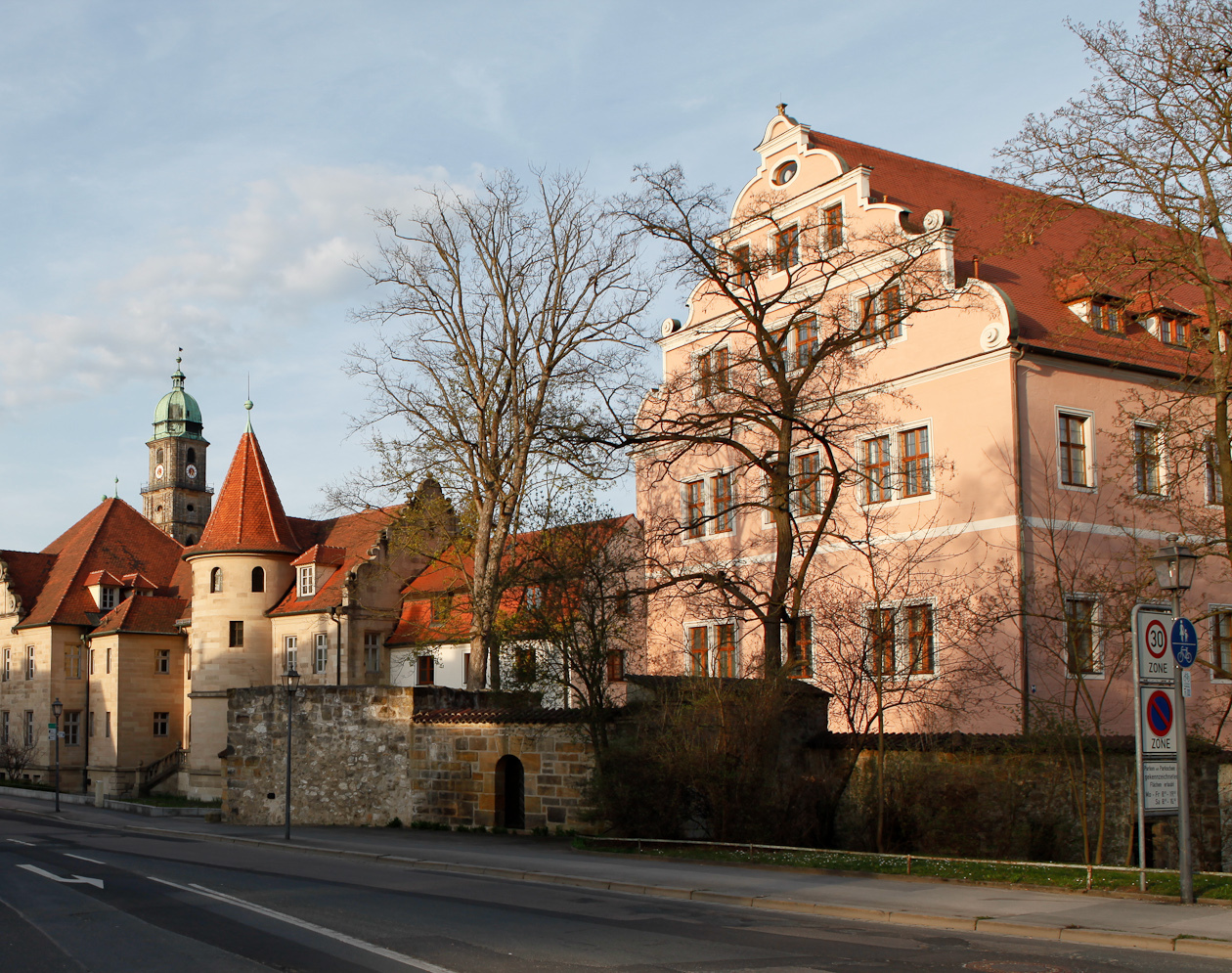

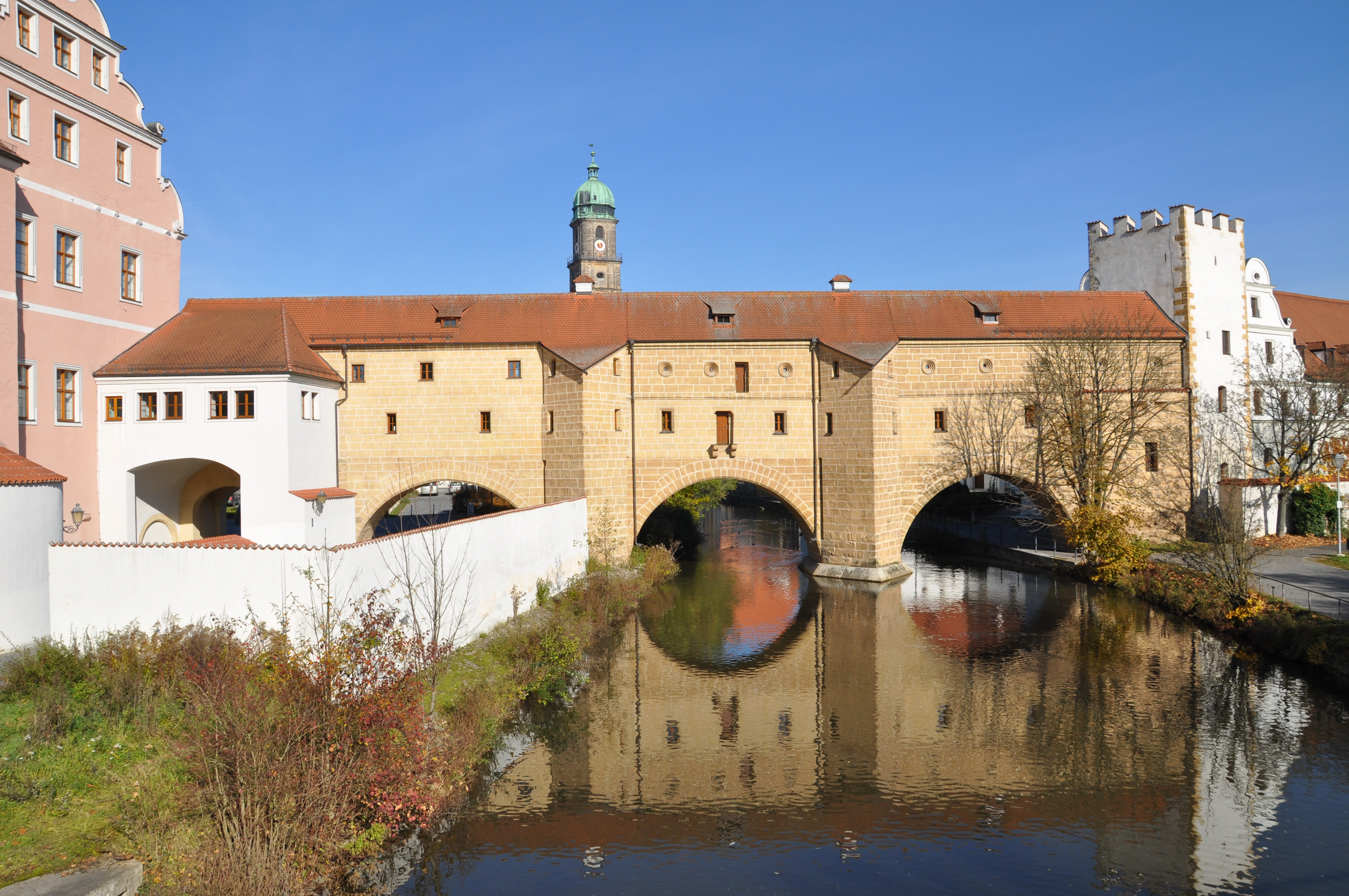

The Electoral Palace (German: Kurfürstliches Schloss) is a Schloss in Amberg. After several large fires in the 17th century, only the south wing (Neues Schloss) remains from the once three-winged palace. It is connected through the fortified bridge Stadtbrille, to the Zeughaus (armory) across the Vils river.

It was built from 1417 by Louis III, Elector Palatine, and replaced the Alte Veste, a Gothic building in the town center, as the electoral court. The original building on the north was added with a south wing, a moat and a gatehouse, by Elector Frederick I turning it into a fortress. Its present appearance with a high voluted gable was set in 1603 by Johannes Schoch, who redesigned the Zeughaus with an added tower on the south. On 1738 horse stables were built as a western wing.

Having served the Electors of the Palatinate from its construction to the abolition of the Electorate, the castle was home, since the 19th century, first to the Royal Bavarian District office and Revenue office, later the District Office of the Bavarian State Amberg District and from 1972 of the District of Amberg-Sulzbach.
