= Ebermannsdorf =

- Municipality
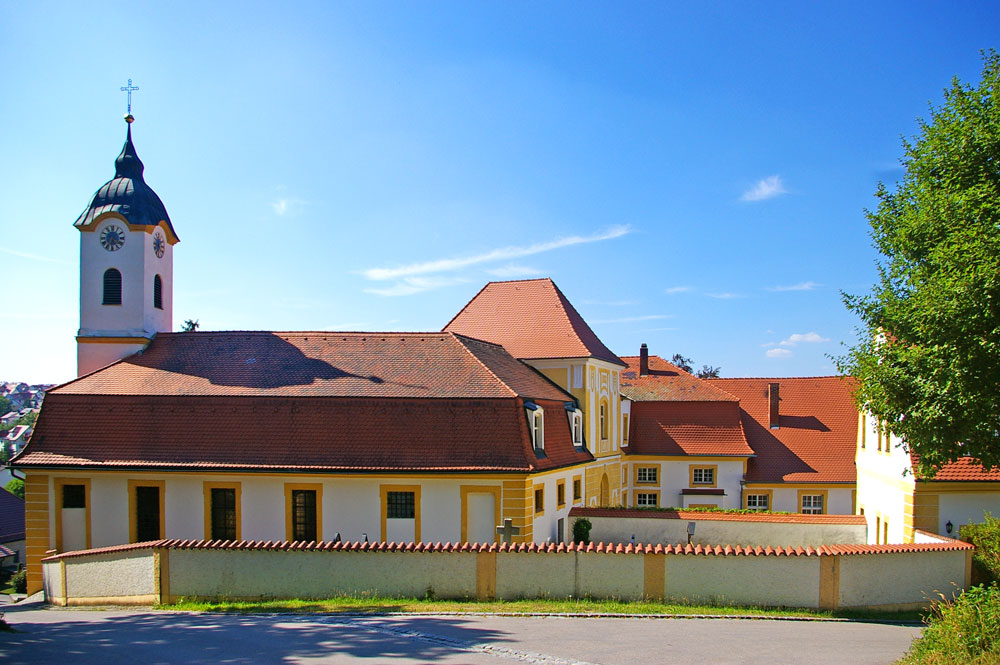
- Ebermannsdorf Castle

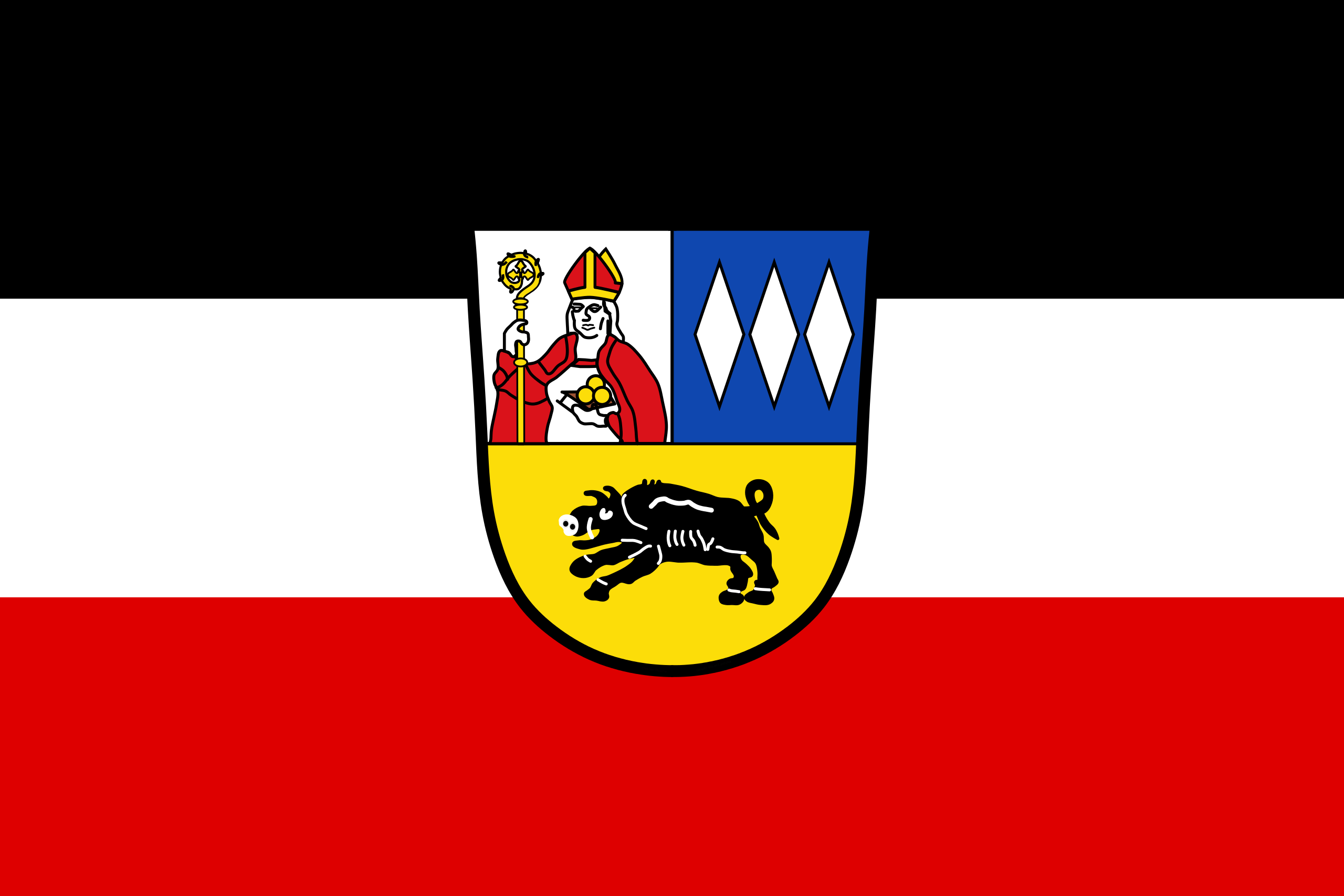
- Flag Coat of arms

- Location of Ebermannsdorf within Amberg-Sulzbach district
- Interactive map of Ebermannsdorf
- Location within Germany Location within Bavaria
- Coordinates: 49°23′35″N 11°56′15″E
- Country: Germany
- State: Bavaria
- Admin. region: Oberpfalz
- District: Amberg-Sulzbach

Government
  - Mayor (2020–26): Erich Meidinger (CSU)

Area
  - Total: 45.39 km^{2} (17.53 sq mi)
- Elevation: 396 m (1,299 ft)

Population (2025-12-31)
  - Total: 2,412
  - Density: 53.14/km^{2} (137.6/sq mi)
- Time zone: UTC+01:00 (CET)
  - Summer (DST): UTC+02:00 (CEST)
- Postal codes: 92263
- Dialling codes: 09624
- Vehicle registration: AS
- Website: www.Ebermannsdorf.de

Ebermannsdorf (German pronunciation: [ˈeːbɐmansdɔʁf]) is a municipality in the district of Amberg-Sulzbach in Bavaria in Germany.

== Geography ==
Apart from Ebermannsdorf the municipality consists of the following villages:

- Arling
- Au
- Breitenbrunn
- Diebis
- Frauenlohe
- Gleicheröd
- Herflucht
- Ipflheim
- Niederarling
- Pittersberg
- Schafhof

== History ==
Eppo von Ebermannsdorf was first mentioned in 1079.
