= Neukirchen bei Sulzbach-Rosenberg (Verwaltungsgemeinschaft) =

- Verwaltungsgemeinschaft
- Location of Neukirchen bei Sulzbach-Rosenberg within Amberg-Sulzbach district
- Interactive map of Neukirchen bei Sulzbach-Rosenberg
- Location within Germany Location within Bavaria
- Coordinates: 49°32′N 11°38′E
- Country: Germany
- State: Bavaria
- Admin. region: Upper Palatinate
- District: Amberg-Sulzbach
- Seat: Neukirchen bei Sulzbach-Rosenberg
- Subdivisions: 3 municipalities

Area
  - Total: 80.02 km^{2} (30.90 sq mi)

Population (2025-12-31)
  - Total: 5,129
  - Density: 64.10/km^{2} (166.0/sq mi)
- Time zone: UTC+01:00 (CET)
  - Summer (DST): UTC+02:00 (CEST)
- Website: vg-neukirchen.de

Neukirchen bei Sulzbach-Rosenberg is a Verwaltungsgemeinschaft (municipal association) in the district of Amberg-Sulzbach in Bavaria, Germany. Its seat is in Neukirchen bei Sulzbach-Rosenberg. It consists of the following municipalities:

1. Etzelwang
2. Neukirchen bei Sulzbach-Rosenberg
3. Weigendorf
