= Königstein (Verwaltungsgemeinschaft) =

- Verwaltungsgemeinschaft
- Location of Königstein within Amberg-Sulzbach district
- Interactive map of Königstein
- Location within Germany Location within Bavaria
- Coordinates: 49°36′N 11°38′E
- Country: Germany
- State: Bavaria
- Admin. region: Upper Palatinate
- District: Amberg-Sulzbach
- Seat: Königstein
- Subdivisions: 2 municipalities

Area
  - Total: 66.16 km^{2} (25.54 sq mi)

Population (2025-12-31)
  - Total: 2,921
  - Density: 44.15/km^{2} (114.3/sq mi)
- Time zone: UTC+01:00 (CET)
  - Summer (DST): UTC+02:00 (CEST)
- Website: www.vg-koenigstein.de

Königstein is a Verwaltungsgemeinschaft (municipal association) in the district of Amberg-Sulzbach in Bavaria, Germany. Its seat is in Königstein. It consists of the following municipalities:

1. Hirschbach
2. Königstein
