= Oonagh (singer) =

German singer (born 1990)

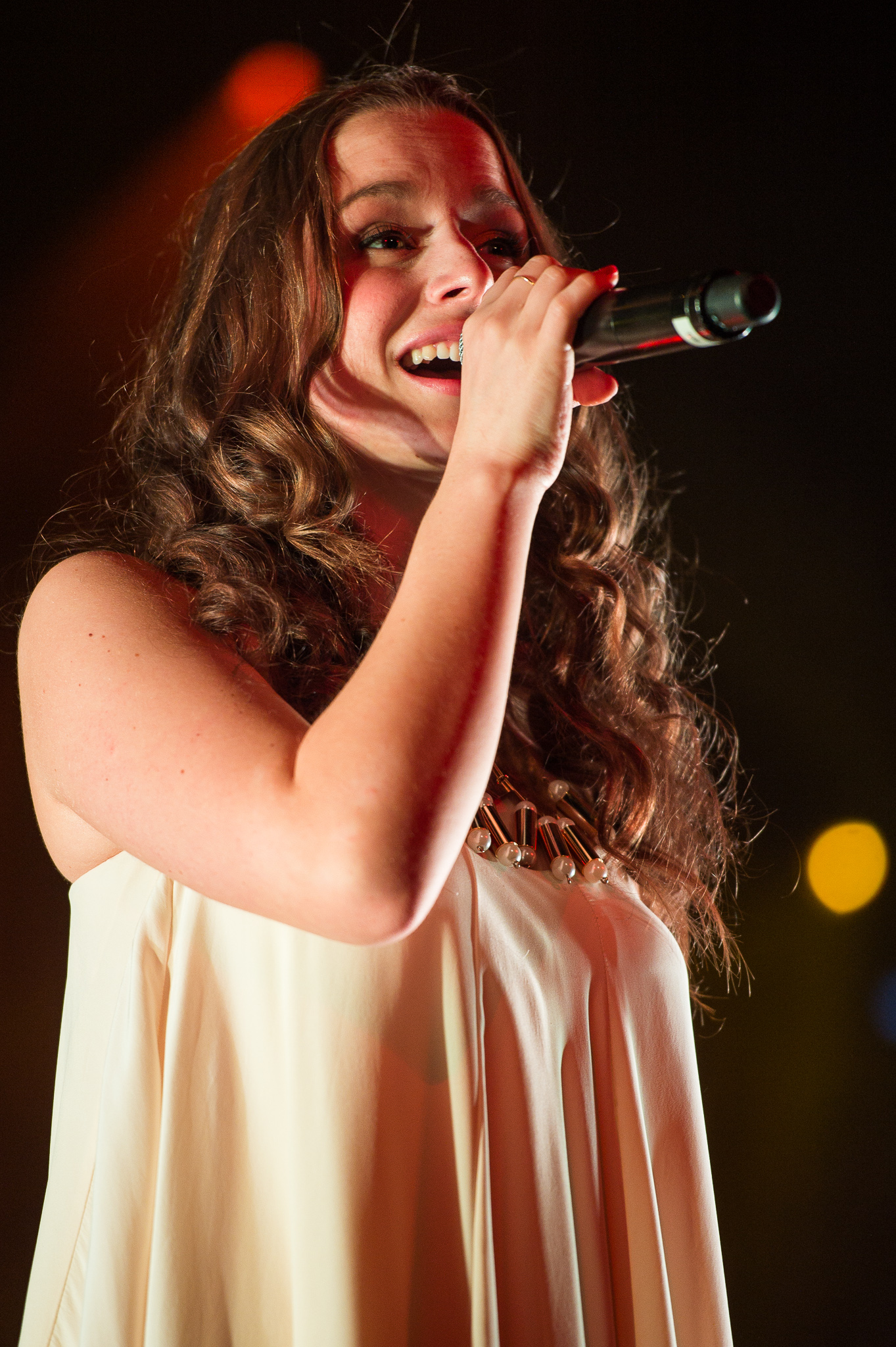
- Delliponti performing as Oonagh in 2015

Background information
- Also known as: Senta
- Born: Senta-Sofia Delliponti; 16 April 1990 (age 36); Wolfsburg, West Germany
- Genres: World; ethnic; Celtic; new-age; pop
- Occupation: Singer
- Years active: 2003–present
- Label: UMG

Senta-Sofia Delliponti (born 16 April 1990) is a German singer. She used the stage name Oonagh (German pronunciation: [ˈuːnäːɣ]) from January 2014 until 2022, at which point she became known as Senta. Her signature musical style is inspired by the mystical lore of J. R. R. Tolkien's universe and by ethnic sounds throughout the world.

== Biography ==
Senta-Sofia Delliponti was born on 16 April 1990 in Wolfsburg to Maik Delliponti and Elena Delliponti. Her father is Italian and a pizzaiolo, and her mother is Bulgarian and a music teacher. She was named after the actress Senta Berger and the capital of her mother's home country, Sofia. She grew up in Gifhorn, Lower Saxony and has a younger brother.

At the age of 13, Delliponti made her first appearance on the casting show Star Search on Sat.1, during which she took second place in the category Music Act from 10 to 15 years. With other candidates on the show, she released the single Smile, which made it to fifth place in the German music charts. She released a second single entitled Mother with the winner of Star Search, Daniel Siegert, although it only made it to number 71 in the charts. She appeared with Daniel Siegert on Die Schlager des Jahres 2003 (a compilation of hits of 2003). She also sang one track on a Christmas album released by TV Allstars. After completing her secondary school diploma in 2006, Delliponti was trained in acting and vocals at the Charlottenburg Acting School in Berlin from 2007 until 2010.

== Discography ==
=== Albums ===
Title	Release	Record label
Oonagh	2014	Universal Music
Aeria	2015	Universal Music
Märchen enden gut	2016	Universal Music
Eine neue Zeit	2019	Universal Music

=== Singles ===
- "Scheißegal" (as Senta-Sofia, 2006)
- "Ich sehe was, was du nicht siehst" (as Senta-Sofia, 2007) – Theme song for German series of Big Brother
- "Gäa" (2014)
- "Kuliko Jana – Eine neue Zeit" (2019)
- "Du bist genug" (2020)
- "Gäa (Akustik Version)" (2020)

== Tours ==
- Mit den Gezeiten Tour 2014 (2014)
- Oonagh Tour 2015 (2015)
- Oonagh Tour 2017 (2017)
