= Ursensollen =

- Municipality
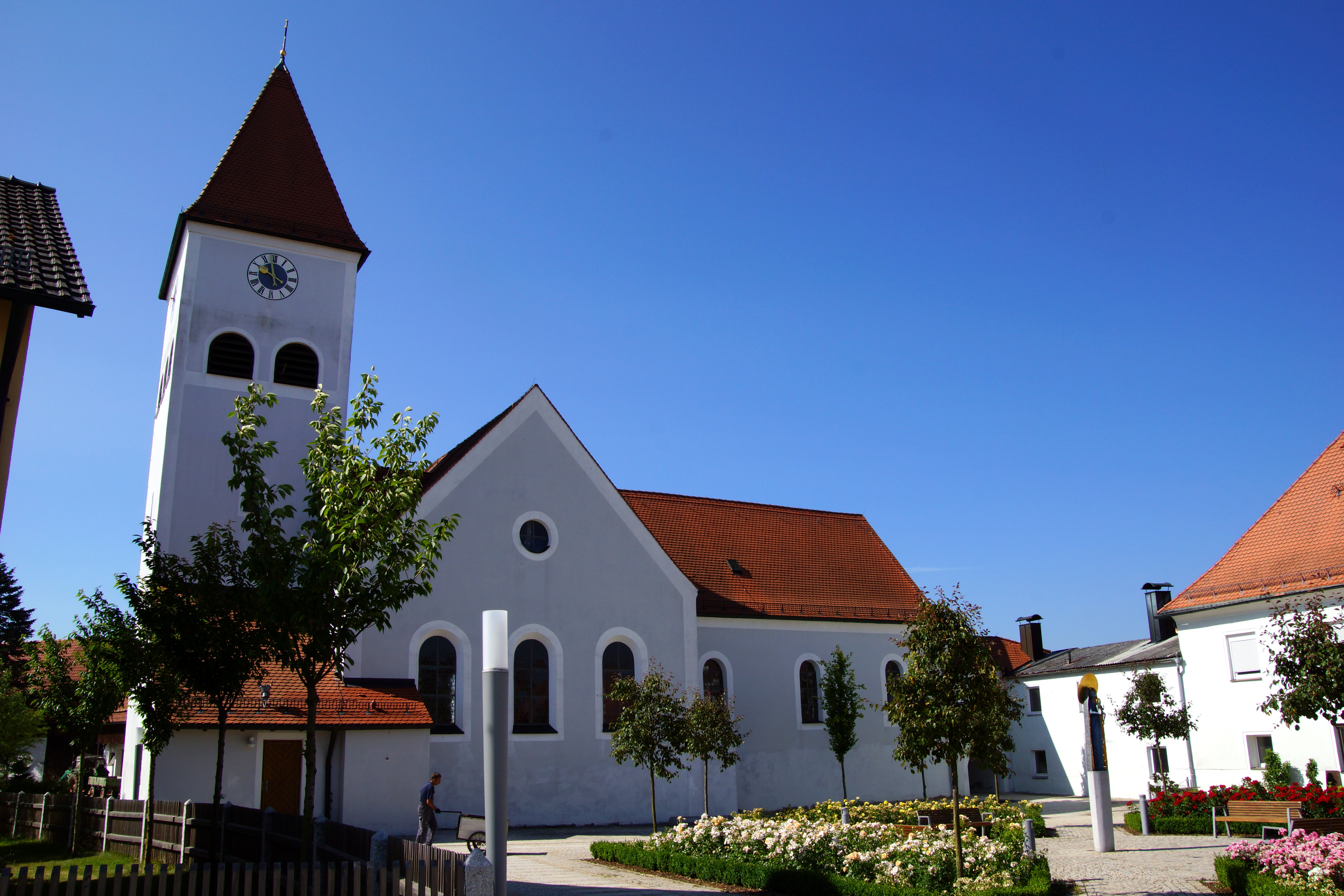
- Church of Saint Vitus

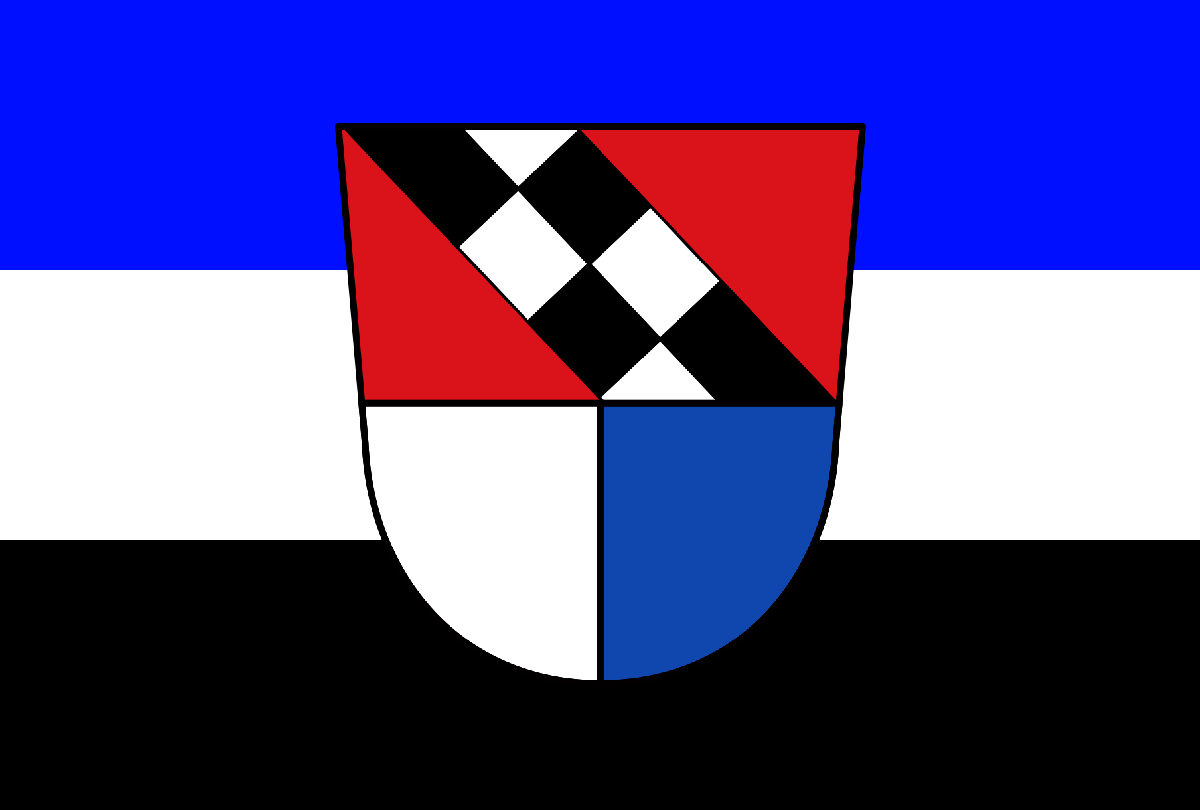
- Flag Coat of arms

- Location of Ursensollen within Amberg-Sulzbach district
- Interactive map of Ursensollen
- Location within Germany Location within Bavaria
- Coordinates: 49°24′4″N 11°45′28″E
- Country: Germany
- State: Bavaria
- Admin. region: Oberpfalz
- District: Amberg-Sulzbach

Government
  - Mayor (2020–26): Albert Geitner

Area
  - Total: 74.65 km^{2} (28.82 sq mi)
- Elevation: 537 m (1,762 ft)

Population (2025-12-31)
  - Total: 3,805
  - Density: 50.97/km^{2} (132.0/sq mi)
- Time zone: UTC+01:00 (CET)
  - Summer (DST): UTC+02:00 (CEST)
- Postal codes: 92289
- Dialling codes: 09628
- Vehicle registration: AS
- Website: www.ursensollen.de

Ursensollen (German pronunciation: [ʊʁsn̩ˈzɔlən]) is a municipality in the district of Amberg-Sulzbach in Bavaria in Germany.

== Geography ==
Ursensollen is in the region Upper Palatinate-North about 10 km to the west of Amberg.

Apart from Ursensollen the municipality consists of the following villages:

- Bittenbrunn
- Darsberg
- Eglhofen
- Ehringsfeld
- Eigentshofen
- Erlheim
- Garsdorf
- Gunzelsdorf
- Haag
- Hausen
- Häuslöd
- Heimhof
- Heinzhof
- Hohenkemnath
- Inselsberg
- Kemnatheröd
- Kotzheim
- Littenschwang
- Oberhof
- Oberleinsiedl
- Ödallerzhof
- Ödgötzendorf
- Reinbrunn
- Richtheim
- Rückertshof
- Salleröd
- Sauheim
- Stockau
- Thonhausen
- Ullersberg
- Unterleinsiedl
- Ursensollen
- Wappersdorf
- Weiherzant
- Winkl
- Wollenzhofen
- Zant

== Population ==
The districts of the town had a population of 2,678 in 1970, 3,518 in 2000, and 3,745 in 2009.
