= Daniel Siegert =

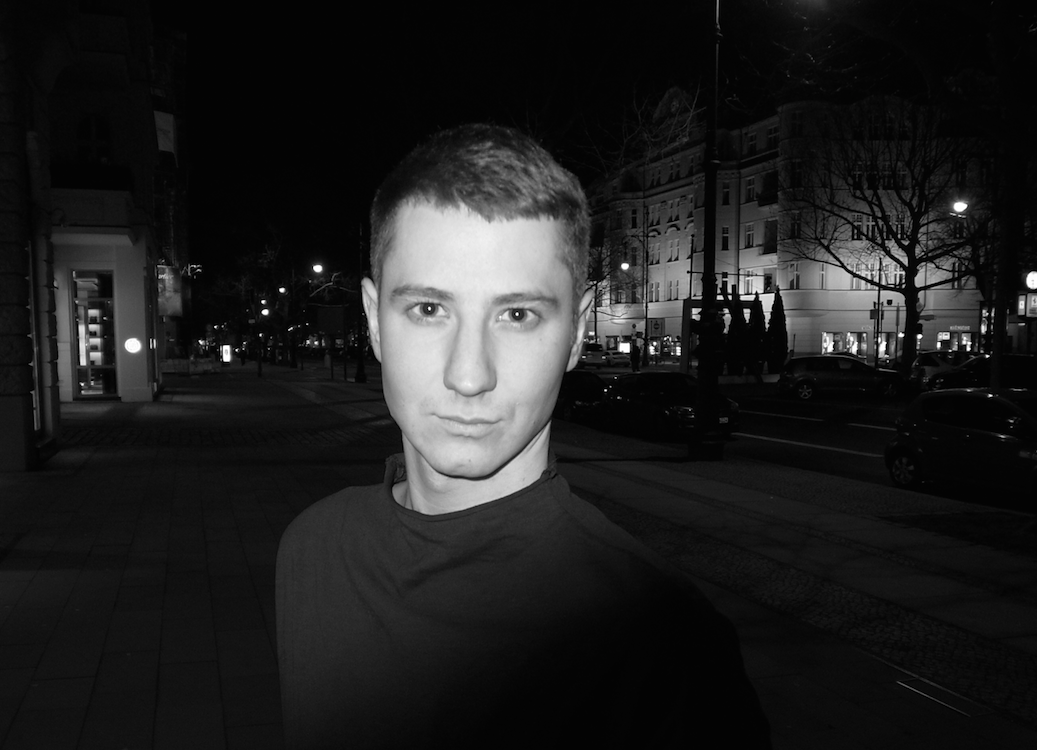

Background information
- Born: Daniel Siegert; 11 February 1991 (age 35); Hahnbach, Bavaria, Germany
- Genres: Pop
- Occupation: Singer
- Years active: 2003–present
- Label: Polydor/Universal

Daniel Siegert (born 11 February 1991 in Hahnbach, Bavaria) is a German singer and winner of the first season of the German version of Star Search.

== Early life ==
Daniel Siegert is the youngest of three brothers, born in Hahnbach, Bavaria, where he still lives today. He graduated with Abitur from Max-Reger-Gymnasium in the neighbouring city of Amberg in 2010.

== Star Search ==
In 2003, Daniel took part in the German version of Star Search, Star Search – Das Duell der Stars von Morgen (Star Search – The Duel of the Stars of Tomorrow), in the category "Music Act von 10 bis 15 Jahren" ("Music act age 10 to 15 years"). He reached the show's finale, where he competed against Senta-Sofia Delliponti. Daniel won the finale, thus making him the first winner of Star Search in his category.

As part of the group Star Search - The Kids, compiled of the finalists and semi-finalists of the category "Music act age 10 to 15 years", he first recorded the single Smile, which peaked at number 5 on the German charts in September 2003. Following this was the single Mother; performed together with runner-up Senta-Sofia Delliponti, the single failed to repeat the success of the preceding single and peaked at number 71 in the German charts.

== TV Allstars ==
As part of The TV Allstars, a charity band consisting of singers from various German casting shows (Star Search, Popstars and Deutschland sucht den Superstar), he reached No.3 on the German single-charts with a cover of Do They Know It's Christmas?, the album The Ultimate Christmas Album reached No.4 on the German album-charts. On the same album, Daniel sings Silent Night, an English version of the well-known German Christmas-song Stille Nacht, which also appeared as a single.

== Solo career ==
Shortly after the finale of Star Search in September 2003, Daniel Siegbert made his solo-debut with the single Let the Sunshine (In My Magic World), which was followed by his first solo-album, Lucky Star, in April 2004. Neither the single nor the album were as successful as his previous collaborations with Star Search – The Kids and The TV Allstars.

== Discography ==
=== Album ===
- Star Search – The Kids (as part of the Star Search finalists and semi-finalists) (2003)
- The Ultimate Christmas Album (as part of The TV Allstars) (2003)
- Lucky Star (2004)

=== Singles ===
- Smile (with Senta-Sofia Delliponti) (2003)
- Mother (ft. Senta-Sofia Delliponti, Jennifer & Oliver) (2003)
- Silent Night (2003)
- Let the Sunshine (In My Magic World) (2004)

== See also ==
- Justin Bieber
- Miley Cyrus
- Billy Gilman
- Heintje
- Kris Kross

Preceded by N/A	Star Search – Music Act age 10 – 15; Winner season 1 (2003)	Succeeded by Maresa Maisenbacher
