= Amberg-Sulzbach =

Coordinates: 49°30′N 11°45′E

- District
- Flag Coat of arms
- Country: Germany
- State: Bavaria
- Adm. region: Upper Palatinate
- Founded: 1972-07-01
- Capital: Amberg

Government
  - District admin.: Richard Reisinger (CSU)

Area
  - Total: 1,255 km^{2} (485 sq mi)

Population (31 December 2025)
  - Total: 103,788
  - Density: 82.70/km^{2} (214.2/sq mi)
- Time zone: UTC+01:00 (CET)
  - Summer (DST): UTC+02:00 (CEST)
- Vehicle registration: AS, BUL, ESB, NAB, SUL
- Website: kreis-as.de

Amberg-Sulzbach (Northern Bavarian: Amberg-Suizboch) is a Landkreis (district) in Bavaria, Germany. It surrounds but does not include the city of Amberg. It is bounded by (from the north and clockwise) the districts of Neustadt an der Waldnaab, Schwandorf, Neumarkt, Nürnberger Land and Bayreuth.

== History ==
The history is linked with the history of the Upper Palatinate and the city of Amberg.

The district was established in 1972 by merging the former district of Amberg and the former district of Sulzbach-Rosenberg, as well as municipalities from other counties (like the town of Auerbach from the dissolved county of Eschenbach in der Oberpfalz).

== Geography ==
The district is located in the geographical centre of Bavaria, 40 km east of Nuremberg. The main axis of the region is the Vils River (an affluent of the Naab) crossing the district from north to south. West of the river, the land rises to the Franconian Jura, while there are gentle hills on the eastern side in the angle between Naab and Vils. The district is mainly covered by forests, especially in its western half.

== Coat of arms ==
District banner of Amberg-Sulzbach

The coat of arms displays:

- The Palatine Lion, which was the heraldic animal of the Upper Palatinate
- The lilies, which were a symbol of the counts of Sulzbach
- The mining tools are a reminder of the mining history of the Upper Palatinate

== Politics ==
=== District council ===
The 2020 local elections produced the following results:

Parties		Vote share	Seats
CSU	Christlich-Soziale Union in Bayern	39,1%	23
FW	Freie Wähler Bayern	16,7%	10
SPD	SPD Bayern	16,1%	10
Grüne	Bündnis 90/Die Grünen Bayern	9,4%	6
JU	Junge Union	7,1%	4
FDP/FWS	FDP Bayern/Freie Wählerschaft	5,2%	3
ÖDP	Ökologisch–Demokratische Partei	5,1%	3
Linke	Die Linke Bayern	1,4%	1

The next local election is scheduled for 2026.

=== District administrator ===
The current district administrator is Richard Reisinger (CSU). He was elected in the 2020 local election.

The district administrator's office is located in the Electoral Palace in Amberg.

== Towns and municipalities ==
Clickable map of towns and municipalities in the district

Towns
1. Auerbach
2. Hirschau
3. Schnaittenbach
4. Sulzbach-Rosenberg
5. Vilseck
Märkte
1. Freihung
2. Hohenburg
3. Kastl
4. Rieden
5. Schmidmühlen
Municipalities
1. Ammerthal
2. Ebermannsdorf
3. Edelsfeld
4. Ensdorf
5. Freudenberg
6. Kümmersbruck
7. Poppenricht
8. Ursensollen

Verwaltungsgemeinschaften
1. Hahnbach; 1. Hahnbach^{1,2}; 2. Gebenbach	2. Illschwang; 1. Birgland; 2. Illschwang^{1}	3. Königstein; 1. Hirschbach; 2. Königstein^{1,2}	4. Neukirchen bei Sulzbach-Rosenberg; 1. Etzelwang; 2. Neukirchen bei Sulzbach-Rosenberg^{1}; 3. Weigendorf
^{1}seat of the Verwaltungsgemeinschaft; ^{2}Markt
