= Königstein (hill) =

Mountain in Saxony, Germany

Coordinates: 50°55′N 14°04′E

Königstein (Berg)
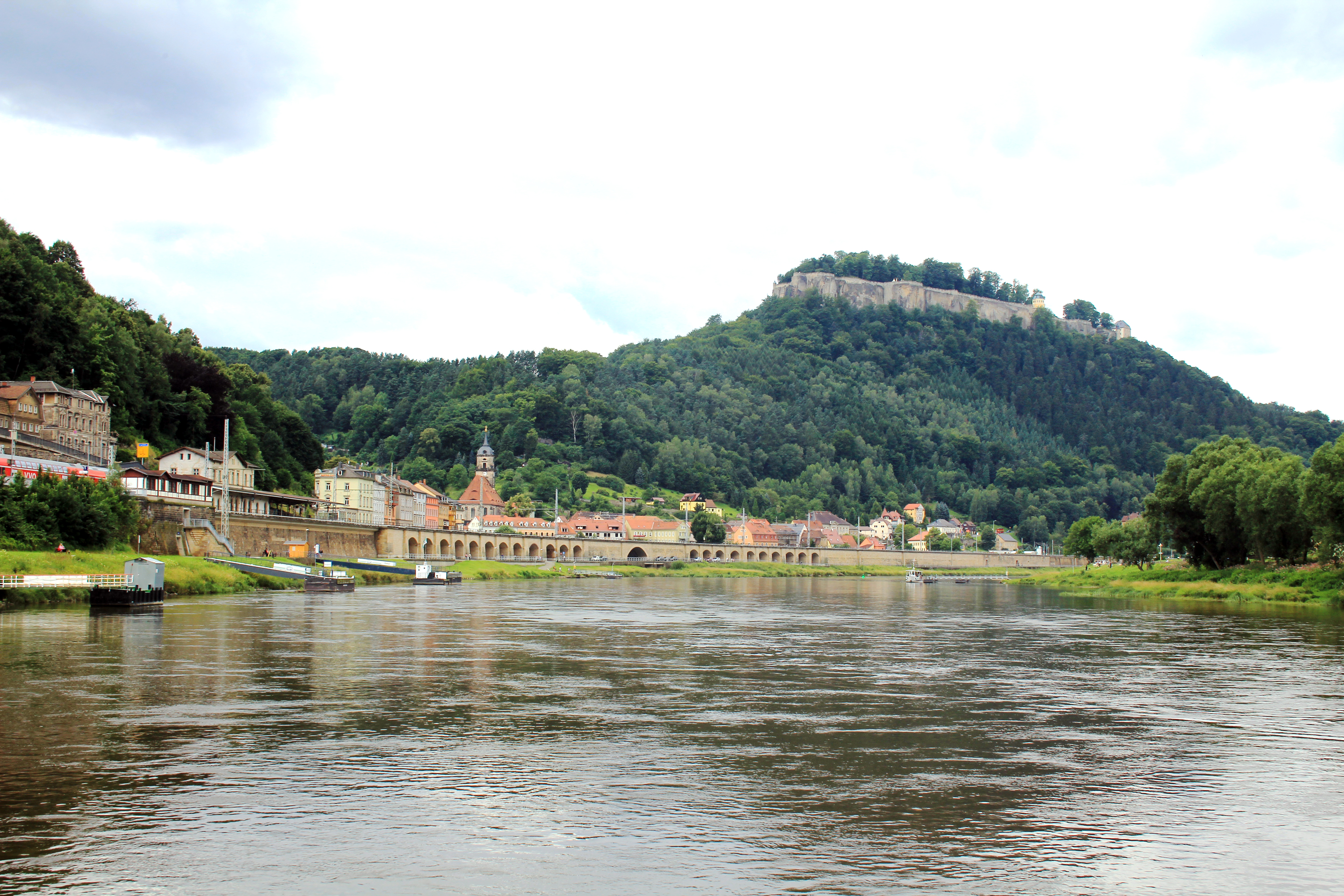
- Königstein Hill from the Elbe river

Geography
- Location: Saxony, Germany

Königstein (German pronunciation: [ˈkøːniçʃtaɪn] or [ˈkøːnikʃtaɪn]) is a mountain of Saxony, southeastern Germany.
