= Kastl, Amberg-Sulzbach =

Kastl
- Municipality
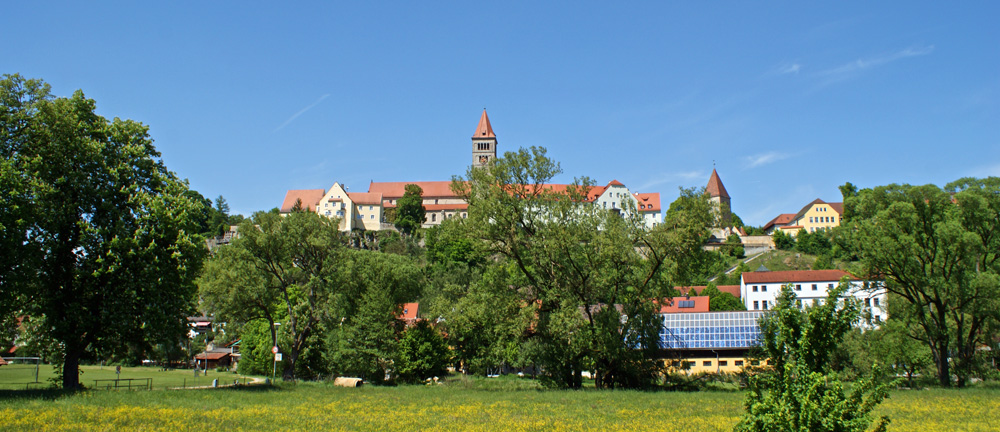
- Kastl Abbey

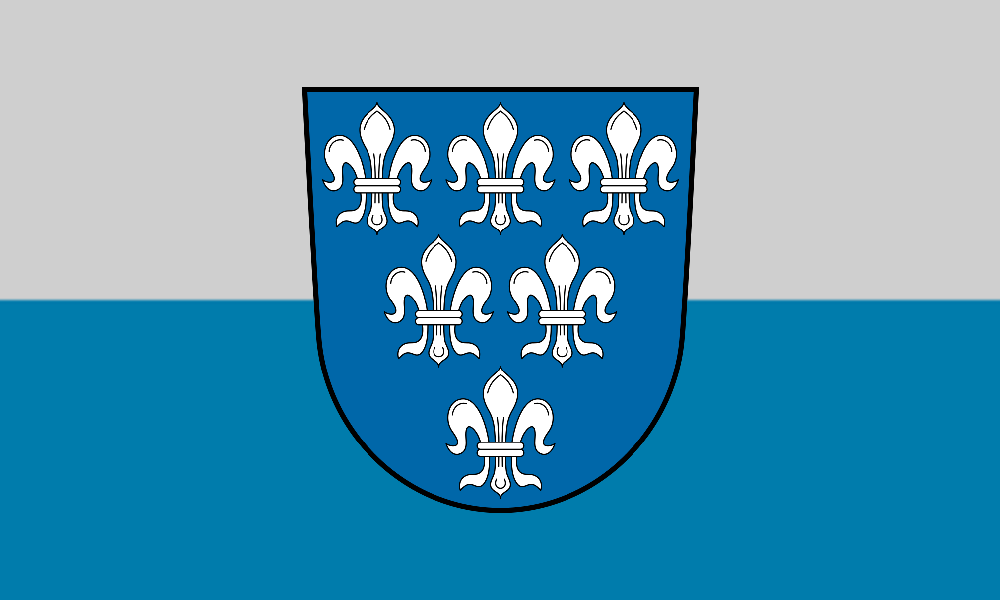
- Flag Coat of arms

- Location of Kastl within Amberg-Sulzbach district
- Interactive map of Kastl
- Location within Germany Location within Bavaria
- Coordinates: 49°22′9″N 11°40′49″E
- Country: Germany
- State: Bavaria
- Admin. region: Oberpfalz
- District: Amberg-Sulzbach

Government
  - Mayor (2020–26): Stefan Braun (CSU)

Area
  - Total: 64.88 km^{2} (25.05 sq mi)
- Elevation: 475 m (1,558 ft)

Population (2025-12-31)
  - Total: 2,487
  - Density: 38.33/km^{2} (99.28/sq mi)
- Time zone: UTC+01:00 (CET)
  - Summer (DST): UTC+02:00 (CEST)
- Postal codes: 92280
- Dialling codes: 09625
- Vehicle registration: AS
- Website: www.kastl.de

Kastl (German pronunciation: [ˈkastl̩]) is a municipality in the district of Amberg-Sulzbach in Bavaria in Germany. A notable part of the village is Kastl Abbey, one of the monasteries in the area.

== Geography ==
Apart from Kastl the municipality consists of the following villages:

- Aicha
- Allmannsfeld
- Appesloh
- Aumühle
- Bärnhof
- Brünnthal
- Deinshof
- Dettnach
- Drahberg
- Flügelsbuch
- Freischweibach
- Gaishof
- Giggelsberg
- Guttenberg
- Haid
- Hainhof
- Halbmühle
- Hellberg
- Hochhaus
- Hohengrund
- Kastl
- Langenberg
- Lauterach
- Mennersberg
- Mühlhausen
- Oberfeld
- Pattershofen
- Pfaffenhofen
- Reusch
- Richt
- Sankt Lampert
- Saugraben
- Schwärz
- Umelsdorf
- Utzenhofen
- Wolfersdorf
- Wolfsfeld
- Zapfl
- Ziegelhütte
