= Postal codes in Germany =

Germany introduced postal codes on 25 July 1941, in the form of a two-digit system that was applied initially for the parcel service and later for all mail deliveries. This system was replaced in 1962 in West Germany by a four-digit system; three years later East Germany followed with its own four-digit system. Whereas the Federal Republic introduced a system with space left for the East German postal system after a possible reunification, such as by omitting all codes starting with '1' (except 1000 for West Berlin) and '9', the German Democratic Republic had a system that used all codes starting from '1' to '9' just for East Germany.

Today, German postal codes are numeric and have consisted of five digits since 1993. Between 1990 and 1993 the previous four-digit codes in the former West were prefixed with the letter "W", and in the former East with the letter "O" (for "Ost", "east" in German). Even though the western system had kept some number ranges free, specifically for later integration of the East in case of reunification, it was decided that the time was right to create an entirely new system for the 1990s, in which larger towns and cities would be divided into multiple postal code areas (the old system had inconsistently used additional numbers after the city's names), and companies receiving large amounts of post (such as mail-order businesses) could be assigned their own private code. This resulted in a system where one could no longer identify the size of the city by the number of trailing zeros in its postal code (such as 2000 for Hamburg or 8000 for Munich).

Post office boxes are arranged in racks containing several dozens of them. Each rack is identified by an individual postal code.

The 1993 system has geographic zones on the first (Postleitzonen) and on the second level (Postleitregion), e.g., 1 is North East Germany, and 10 is a zone in the inner city of Berlin.

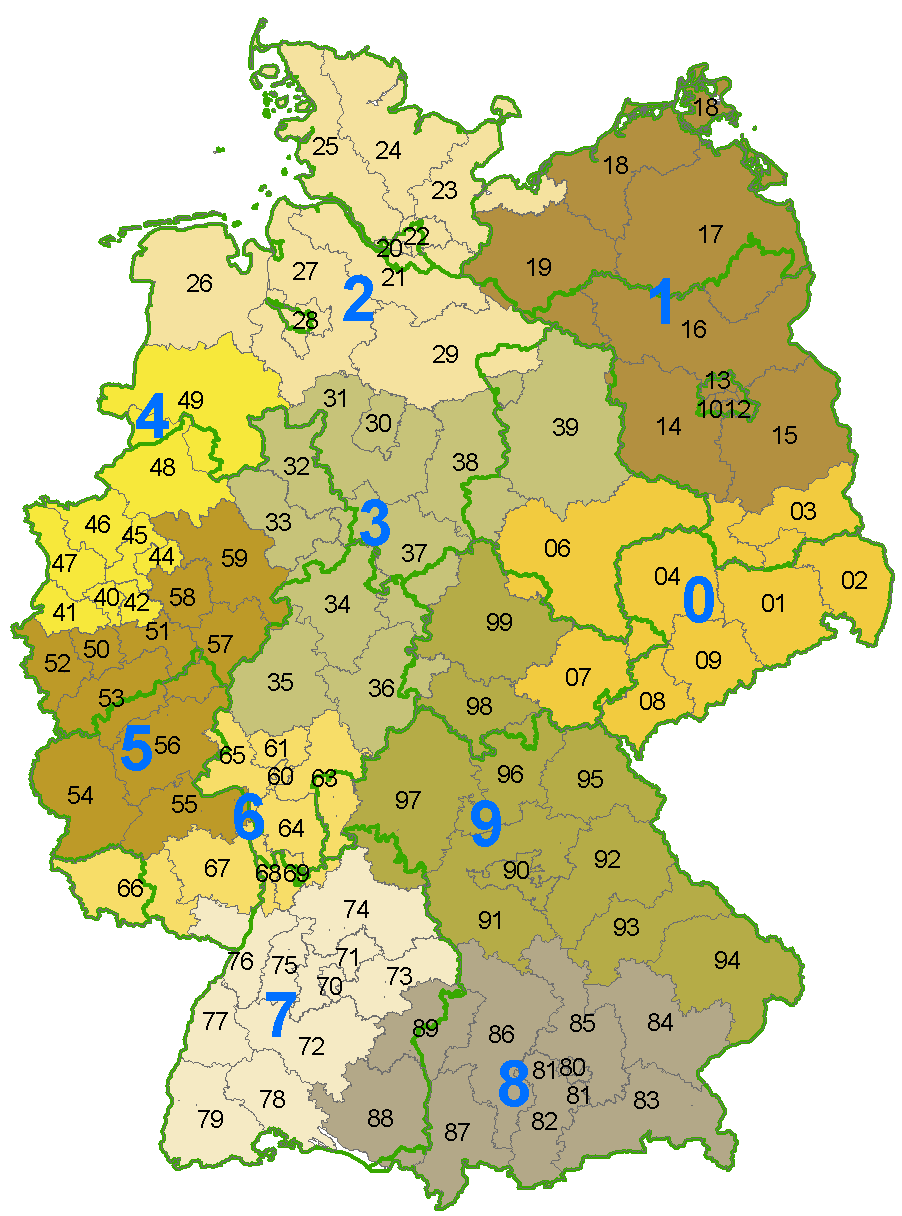
German Postleitzahl map of the first two digits. The green lines mark state borders, which do not always correspond with postal code areas.

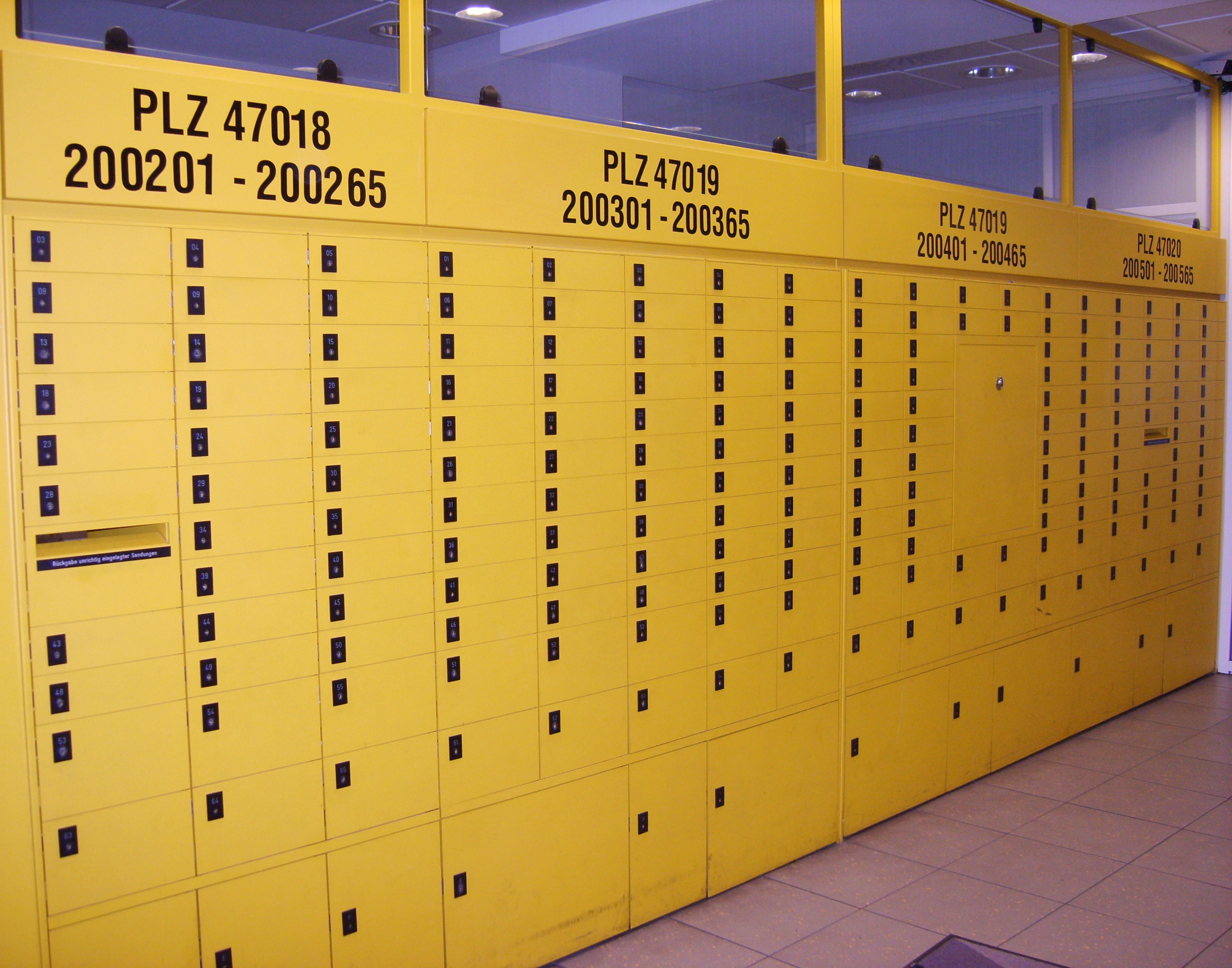
P. O. box racks in a German post office of the Duisburg post code area. The top number is the postal code (PLZ=Postleitzahl) for the individual rack.

On 31 December 2007, the zones had the following area and population:

Leitzone	Area (km^{2})	Population	Region covered	Large cities
0	37,187.8	6,819,607	Saxony, southern parts of Saxony-Anhalt and Brandenburg, eastern part of Thuringia	Dresden, Leipzig, Halle, Chemnitz, Cottbus, Jena
1	47,642.4	7,034,541	Berlin, larger parts of Brandenburg and Mecklenburg-Vorpommern, small parts of Lower Saxony and Saxony-Anhalt	Berlin, Potsdam, Frankfurt (Oder), Rostock, Schwerin
2	44,207.4	8,691,409	Hamburg, Schleswig-Holstein, northern part of Lower Saxony, Bremen, small part of Mecklenburg-Vorpommern	Hamburg, Lübeck, Kiel, Bremen, Bremerhaven, Oldenburg
3	45,488.1	9,012,212	southern part of Lower Saxony, eastern part of Westphalia, northern parts of Hesse, Thuringia and Saxony-Anhalt	Hanover, Bielefeld, Kassel, Fulda, Gießen, Göttingen, Brunswick, Magdeburg
4	20,212.3	10,331,535	north-western part of North Rhine-Westphalia, south-western part of Lower Saxony	Düsseldorf, Dortmund, Essen, Duisburg, Bochum, Wuppertal, Bielefeld, Münster, Mönchengladbach, Gelsenkirchen, Oberhausen, Osnabrück
5	28,834.5	9,233,815	south-western part of North Rhine-Westphalia, larger part of Rhineland-Palatinate, small part of Hesse	Cologne, Bonn, Aachen, Mainz, Koblenz, Trier
6	17,247.9	7,540,503	southern parts of Hesse, Rhineland-Palatinate, Saarland, small parts of Bavaria and Baden-Württemberg	Frankfurt (Main), Wiesbaden, Darmstadt, Saarbrücken, Heidelberg, Mannheim, Aschaffenburg
7	27,864.2	8,715,898	larger part of Baden-Württemberg, small part of Rhineland-Palatinate	Stuttgart, Karlsruhe, Tübingen, Freiburg, Konstanz, Baden-Baden
8	36,427.2	7,675,001	southern part of Bavaria, south-eastern part of Baden-Württemberg	Munich, Rosenheim, Augsburg, Ulm, Ingolstadt
9	47,803.7	7,163,416	northern part of Bavaria (Franconia), larger part of Thuringia, small part of Baden-Württemberg	Nuremberg, Würzburg, Erfurt, Weimar, Eisenach, Bamberg, Bayreuth

There are three states (Saxony, Saarland and Schleswig-Holstein), in addition to the city states (Berlin, Bremen and Hamburg), that lie completely within one postal zone, while three states (Lower Saxony, Saxony-Anhalt and Baden-Württemberg) cover four postal zones.

== History of postal code systems in Germany ==
=== Precursors ===
With the help of ring number stamps, the administration of the Thurn-und-Taxis-Post made it possible for the first time in 1853 to recognize places from a region by a range of numbers. From number 338, assigned on 1 October 1854 to the post office in Lehesten, the numbers are randomly assigned.

In 1917, Carl Bobe divided Germany into metropolitan areas, regional areas and local areas in an organizational scheme.

== See also ==
- Briefzentrum (Deutsche Post)
