= List of Hungarian flags =

This is a list of flags used in Hungary. For more information about the national flag, visit the article Flag of Hungary.

== Current flags ==
=== National flags ===
Flag	From	Use	Description	Ratio
	11 April 1848	Civil flag	A horizontal tricolor of red, white, and green.	1:2
	23 May 1957	State flag	A horizontal tricolor of red, white, and green.	1:2
	23 May 1957	War flag	A horizontal tricolor of red, white, and green.	1:2
	11 April 1848	Civil flag	A horizontal tricolor of red, white, and green.	2:3
	18 August 1957	Civil ensign	A horizontal tricolor of red, white, and green.	2:3
	1990	State ensign	A horizontal tricolor of red, white, and green.	2:3
	1990	Unofficial state flag	A horizontal tricolor of red, white, and green with the state coat of arms in the center.	1:2
	1990	Unofficial civil flag	A horizontal tricolor of red, white, and green with the state coat of arms in the middle of the white field.	2:3
	23 May 1957	State flag (vertical version)	A horizontal tricolor of red, white, and green.	2:1
	23 May 1957	State flag (vertical version)	A vertical tricolor of red, white, and green.	2:1
	1990	Unofficial state flag (vertical version)	A vertical tricolor of red, white, and green with the state coat of arms in the middle of the white field.	2:1

=== Governmental flags ===
Flag	From	Use	Description	Ratio
	1950s	Pennant of the river police	A triangular white pennant with a blue-bordered white lozenge in the center.	3:5

=== Military flags ===
Flag	From	Use	Description	Ratio
	7 January 2012	Flag of the president of Hungary as commander-in-chief of the Hungarian Defence Force	A white flag bordered with a red and green "wolf-teeth" pattern, charged with the state coat of arms flanked by two angels in the center.	2:3

==== Army flags ====
Flag	From	Use	Description	Ratio
	2012	Flag of the Hungarian Defence Force	A white flag with the emblem of the Hungarian Defence Force in the center.	2:3
	15 March 1991	Unit colour of the Hungarian Defence Force	A white flag bordered with a red and green "flame" pattern, charged with the state coat of arms framed by oak and olive branches in the center.	3:4
	1 January 2001	Standard of the National Ceremonial Cavalry Unit	A white flag bordered with a red and green "wolf-teeth" pattern, charged with the state coat of arms in the center.	1:1

==== Naval flags ====
Flag	From	Use	Description	Ratio
	1991	Naval ensign	A white flag bordered with a red and green "wolf-teeth" pattern, charged with the state coat of arms on the hoist side.	3:4
	1991	Naval ensign	A white flag bordered with a red and green "wolf-teeth" pattern, charged with the state coat of arms on the hoist side.	4:5
	1991	Senior Commander's pennant	A triangular white pennant bordered with a red and green "wolf-teeth" pattern, charged with the state coat of arms on the hoist side.	3:4
	1991	Ministerial pennant	A swallow-tailed horizontal tricolor of red, white, and green.	3:4
	1991	Masthead pennant	A triangular pennant of red, white, and green.	21:200

=== Subdivision flags ===
Flag	From	Flag of	Description	Ratio
	10 October 1991	Bács-Kiskun County	A horizontal bicolor of blue and white with the county's coat of arms in the center.	1:2
	27 May 1991	Baranya County	A green flag with the county's coat of arms and the inscription "BARANYA-MEGYE" (Baranya County) in the center.	1:2
	27 March 1992	Békés County	A horizontal bicolor of blue and white with the county's coat of arms and the inscription "BÉKÉS-MEGYE" (Békés County) in the center.	2:3
	29 August 1991	Borsod-Abaúj-Zemplén County	A horizontal bicolor of red and blue with the county's coat of arms in the center.	1:2
	15 June 1991	Csongrád County	A green flag with the county's coat of arms and the inscription "CSONGRÁD MEGYE" (Csongrád County) in the center.	1:2
	13 March 1992	Fejér County	A horizontal bicolor of yellow and green with the county's coat of arms and the inscription "FEJÉR VÁRMEGYE" (Fejér County) in the center.	2:3
	28 December 1991	Győr-Moson-Sopron County	A horizontal bicolor of red and blue with the county's coat of arms in the center.	1:2
	31 December 1991	Hajdú-Bihar County	A white flag bordered with a blue and yellow "wolf-teeth" pattern, charged with the county's coat of arms in the center.	1:2
	22 October 1991	Heves County	A green flag with the county's coat of arms in the center.	7:10
	8 February 1991	Jász-Nagykun-Szolnok County	A horizontal bicolor of blue and white with the county's coat of arms and the inscription "JÁSZ-NAGYKUN-SZOLNOK-MEGYE" (Jász-Nagykun-Szolnok County) in the center.	1:2
	21 March 1991	Komárom-Esztergom County	A white flag with the county's coat of arms and the inscription "KOMÁROM-ESZTERGOM MEGYE" (Komárom-Esztergom County) in the center.	2:3
	27 June 1991	Nógrád County	A blue flag with the county's coat of arms and the inscription "NÓGRÁD A KÖZÜGYÉRT" (Nógrád for public affairs) on the hoist side.	100:149
	25 January 1991	Pest County	A horizontal bicolor of blue and yellow with the county's coat of arms and the inscription "PEST MEGYE" (Pest County) on the hoist side.	1:2
	21 May 1992	Somogy County	A horizontal bicolor of blue and yellow with the county's coat of arms and the inscription "SOMOGY-MEGYE" (Somogy County) on the hoist side.	2:3
	7 September 1992	Szabolcs-Szatmár-Bereg County	A white flag bordered with a blue and red "wolf-teeth" pattern, charged with the county's coat of arms and the inscription "SZABOLCS-SZATMÁR-BEREG MEGYE" (Szabolcs-Szatmár-Bereg County) in the center.	2:3
	27 April 1991	Tolna County	A horizontal bicolor of blue and white with the county's coat of arms and the inscription "TOLNA MEGYE" (Tolna County) in the center.	2:3
	31 May 1991	Vas County	A horizontal bicolor of white and blue with the county's coat of arms and the inscription "VAS MEGYE" (Vas County) in the center.	1:2
	5 July 1991	Veszprém County	A horizontal bicolor of white and green with the county's coat of arms on the hoist side.	2:3
	9 July 2010	Zala County	A horizontal bicolor of blue and white with the county's coat of arms and the inscription "ZALA MEGYE" (Zala County) in the center.	1:2

==== Municipal flags ====
Flag	From	Flag of	Description	Ratio
	15 September 2011	Budapest	A white flag bordered with a red and green "wolf-teeth" pattern, charged with the city's coat of arms in the center.	2:3
	15 September 2011	Budapest	A white flag bordered with a red and green "wolf-teeth" pattern, charged with the city's coat of arms in the center.	2:1

=== Other flags ===
==== Political flags ====
Flag	From	Flag of	Description	Ratio
	1993	Hungarian Justice and Life Party	A white flag bordered with a red and green "wolf-teeth" pattern, charged with the party emblem in the center.	2:3
	1997	Hungarian Christian Democratic Association	A red and green flag charged with a white cross and the inscription "Magyar Kereszténydemokrata Szövetség" (Hungarian Christian Democratic Association).	c. 2:5
	2000s	Fidesz	A white flag with the party emblem in the center.	2:3
	2003–2020	Jobbik	A white flag bordered with a red and green "wolf-teeth" pattern, charged with the party emblem and the inscription "Jobbik Magyarországért Mozgalom" (Movement for a Better Hungary) in the center.	3:2
	2009	Civil Union Forum	A white flag bordered with a red and green "wolf-teeth" pattern, charged with the inscriptions "CÖF" and "Civil Összefogás Fórum" (Civil Union Forum) in the center.	3:5
	2012	Hungarian Socialist Party	A red flag with the acronym "MSZP" in the center.	2:3
	2012	Together	A white flag with the party emblem in the center.	2:3
	2013	Hungarian Dawn Movement	Nine horizontal stripes alternating red and white with the party emblem (a black triskelion) on a vertical red stripe at the hoist.	2:3
	2013	Hungarian Liberal Party	A blue flag charged with the party emblem and the inscriptions "Liberálisok" (Liberals) and "Magyar Liberális Párt" (Hungarian Liberal Party).	2:3
	2013	Modern Hungary Movement	A white flag with the party emblem in the center.	2:3
	2011–present	Democratic Coalition		
	2018–present	Our Homeland Movement	A green flag with a white flapping flag on a pole. On that flag are seven alternating horizontal stripes and a patriarchal cross. Beneath are the words "Mi Hazánk" (Our Homeland).	
	1995–present	National Self-Government of Germans in Hungary		
	2011–present	Democratic Community of Welfare and Freedom		

==== Organization flags ====
Flag	Date	Flag of	Description	Ratio
	1999–present	Hungarian State Railways	A horizontal bicolor of white and blue with the company's logo in the center of the white field.	2:3
	1999–present	Hungarian State Railways	A horizontal bicolor of white and blue with the company's logo in the center of the white field.	3:2
	2003–present	Hungarian Flag Society	A horizontal triband of white, green, and white with a red triangle based on the hoist side.	2:3

==== House flags ====
Flag	Date	Flag of	Description	Ratio
	2001–present	Lake Balaton Shipping Ltd.	Seven yellow-fimbriated horizontal stripes alternating blue and white, charged with the acronym "BH" on a red field in the canton.	3:5

==== Yacht club flags ====
Flag	Date	Use	Description	Ratio
	2000s–present	Ensign of the Hungarian Yachting Association	A red flag charged with the state coat of arms on a white-fimbriated green Nordic cross.	5:8
	1957–present	Ensign of Lake Fertő Sailing Association	A red-bordered light blue flag with a yellow cross in the center.	2:3
	1912–present	Burgee of Balatoni Yacht Club	A triangular yellow pennant charged with a white-fimbriated blue forked cross.	3:5
	1933–present	Burgee of Hungária Yacht Club	A triangular blue pennant charged with a white-fimbriated red Nordic cross.	3:5
	1990–present	Burgee of Spartacus Sailing Club	A triangular red pennant charged with a yellow fouled anchor topped with the Holy Crown of Hungary on a blue-fimbriated white Nordic cross.	3:4
	1993–present	Burgee of BS-Fűzfő Sailing Club	A triangular green pennant charged with a white Nordic cross.	c. 4:7
	1994–present	Burgee of Földvár Yacht Club	A triangular white pennant charged with a blue-bordered white disk bearing the acronym "FYC" superimposed on a white-fimbriated blue Nordic cross.	c. 1:2
	1996–present	Burgee of Balatonfüredi Yacht Club	A triangular blue pennant charged with a white cross in the center and the Holy Crown of Hungary in the canton.	3:5

==== Ethnic Hungarian minorities' flags ====
Flag	Date	Flag of	Description	Ratio
	17 January 2004 – present	Székely Land	A blue flag with a horizontal gold stripe in the center, charged with a gold eight-pointed star and a silver crescent in the canton.	2:3
	23 September 2005 – present	Hungarians in Vojvodina	A horizontal tricolor of red, white, and green, charged with the state coat of arms of Hungary in the center.	2:3
	16 May 2015 – present	Partium	A white flag charged with four thin red stripes alternating with white in the lower third, and a red patriarchal cross in the canton.	2:3
	25 July 2019 – present	Csángós		
	23 September 2020 – present	Hungarians in Vojvodina	A horizontal tricolor of red, green, and white, charged with the state coat of arms of Vojvodina and Hungary in the center.	2:3
	2015 – present	Hungarians in Slovakia	A horizontal tricolor of red, white, and green, with the Hungarian coat of arms with a crown on top.	2:3

== Historical flags ==
=== National flags ===
Flag	Date	Use	Description	Ratio
	895–1000	Flag of the Grand Principality of Hungary	A red swallow-tailed flag.	—
	1001–1038	Flag of the Kingdom of Hungary	A red swallow-tailed flag.	—
	1041–1044	Flag of the Kingdom of Hungary	A red swallow-tailed flag.	—
	1046–1172	Flag of the Kingdom of Hungary	A red flag with a white latin cross in the center.	—
	1172–1196	Flag of the Kingdom of Hungary	A red flag with a white patriarchal cross in the center.	—
	1196–1272	Flag of the Kingdom of Hungary	A red flag with a white patriarchal cross on a green triple mount in the center.	—
	1272–1301	Flag of the Árpád dynasty	Eight horizontal stripes alternating red and white.	—
	1301–1382	Flag of the Kingdom of Hungary	Eight horizontal stripes alternating red and white with a yellow fleur-de-lis pattern on a vertical blue stripe at the hoist.	—
	1387–1437	Flag of the Kingdom of Hungary	A red flag divided into four quarters: eight horizontal stripes alternating white and red in the first and fourth quarters, a white eagle in the second quarter and a white lion in the third quarter.	—
	1440–1444	Flag of the Kingdom of Hungary	A red flag divided into four quarters: eight horizontal stripes alternating white and red in the first and fourth quarters and a white eagle in the second and third quarters.	—
	1458–1490	Flag of the Kingdom of Hungary	A red swallow-tailed flag divided into four quarters: eight horizontal stripes alternating white and red in the first and fourth quarters, a white patriarchal cross on a green triple mount in the second quarter, a white lion in the third quarter and the coat of arms of the Hunyadi family in the center.	—
	1458–1490	Flag of the Kingdom of Hungary	A red swallow-tailed flag divided into four quarters: eight horizontal stripes alternating white and red in the first quarter, a white patriarchal cross on a green triple mount in the second quarter, three crowned golden leopards' heads on a blue field in the third quarter, a white lion in the fourth quarter and the coat of arms of the Hunyadi family in the center.	—
	1490–1516	Flag of the Kingdom of Hungary	A red swallow-tailed flag divided into four quarters: eight horizontal stripes alternating red and white in the first and fourth quarters and a white patriarchal cross on a green triple mount in the second and third quarters.	—
	1516–1526	Flag of the Kingdom of Hungary	A red swallow-tailed flag divided into four quarters: eight horizontal stripes alternating red and white in the first quarter, a white patriarchal cross on a green triple mount in the second quarter, three crowned golden leopards' heads on a blue field in the third quarter, a white lion in the fourth quarter and a white eagle on a red escutcheon in the center.	—
	18th century – 11 April 1848	Flag of the Kingdom of Hungary as part of the Habsburg monarchy and the Austrian Empire	A horizontal bicolor of black and yellow.	2:3
	15 March 1848 – August 1849	Flag used by Hungarians revolting against the Habsburgs	A white flag bordered with a red and green "wolf-teeth" pattern, charged with the state ("Kossuth") coat of arms in the center.	1:1
	April – August 1849	Flag used by Hungarian State	A horizontal tricolor of red, white, and green with the state coat of arms in the center.	1:2
	11 April 1848 – April 1849	Flag of the Kingdom of Hungary	A horizontal tricolor of red, white, and green with the crowned small coat of arms in the center.	1:2
	11 April 1848 – April 1849	Flag of the Kingdom of Hungary	A horizontal tricolor of red, white, and green with the crowned small coat of arms in the center.	2:3
	1849 – 28 July 1867	Flag of the Kingdom of Hungary as part of the Austrian Empire	A horizontal bicolor of black and yellow.	2:3
	28 July 1867 – 1869	Flag of the Kingdom of Hungary	A horizontal tricolor of red, white, and green with the crowned small coat of arms in the center.	1:2
	28 July 1867 – 1869	Flag of the Kingdom of Hungary	A horizontal tricolor of red, white, and green with the crowned small coat of arms in the center.	2:3
	1869 – 9 February 1874	Flag of the Kingdom of Hungary	A horizontal tricolor of red, white, and green with the crowned small coat of arms in the center.	1:2
	1869 – 9 February 1874	Flag of the Kingdom of Hungary	A horizontal tricolor of red, white, and green with the crowned small coat of arms in the center.	2:3
	9 February 1874 – 12 January 1896	Flag of the Kingdom of Hungary	A horizontal tricolor of red, white, and green with the crowned small coat of arms in the center.	1:2
	9 February 1874 – 12 January 1896	Flag of the Kingdom of Hungary	A horizontal tricolor of red, white, and green with the crowned small coat of arms in the center.	2:3
	12 January 1896 – 6 November 1915	Flag of the Kingdom of Hungary	A horizontal tricolor of red, white, and green with the crowned small coat of arms in the center.	1:2
	12 January 1896 – 6 November 1915	Flag of the Kingdom of Hungary	A horizontal tricolor of red, white, and green with the crowned small coat of arms in the center.	2:3
	12 January 1896 – 6 November 1915	Flag of the Kingdom of Hungary	A horizontal tricolor of red, white, and green with the crowned small coat of arms flanked by two angels in the center.	1:2
	12 January 1896 – 6 November 1915	Flag of the Kingdom of Hungary	A horizontal tricolor of red, white, and green with the crowned small coat of arms flanked by two angels in the center.	2:3
	6 November 1915 – 29 November 1918	Flag of the Kingdom of Hungary and the Hungarian People's Republic	A horizontal tricolor of red, white, and green with the crowned small coat of arms in the center.	1:2
	6 November 1915 – 29 November 1918	Flag of the Kingdom of Hungary and the Hungarian People's Republic	A horizontal tricolor of red, white, and green with the crowned small coat of arms in the center.	2:3
	6 November 1915 – 29 November 1918	Flag of the Kingdom of Hungary and the Hungarian People's Republic	A horizontal tricolor of red, white, and green with the crowned small coat of arms flanked by two angels in the center.	1:2
	6 November 1915 – 29 November 1918	Flag of the Kingdom of Hungary and the Hungarian People's Republic	A horizontal tricolor of red, white, and green with the crowned small coat of arms flanked by two angels in the center.	2:3
	29 November 1918 – 21 March 1919	Flag of the Hungarian People's Republic	A horizontal tricolor of red, white, and green with the crownless small ("Károlyi") coat of arms in the center.	1:2
	29 November 1918 – 21 March 1919	Flag of the Hungarian People's Republic	A horizontal tricolor of red, white, and green with the crownless small ("Károlyi") coat of arms in the center.	2:3
	21 March – 1 August 1919	Flag of the Hungarian Soviet Republic	A plain red flag.	1:2
	21 March – 1 August 1919	Flag of the Hungarian Soviet Republic	A plain red flag.	2:3
	2 August – 6 August 1919	Flag of the Hungarian People's Republic	A horizontal tricolor of red, white, and green with the crownless small ("Károlyi") coat of arms in the center.	1:2
	2 August – 6 August 1919	Flag of the Hungarian People's Republic	A horizontal tricolor of red, white, and green with the crownless small ("Károlyi") coat of arms in the center.	2:3
	August 1919 – mid/late 1946	Flag of the Hungarian Republic and the Kingdom of Hungary	A horizontal tricolor of red, white, and green with the crowned small coat of arms in the center.	1:2
	August 1919 – mid/late 1946	Flag of the Hungarian Republic and the Kingdom of Hungary	A horizontal tricolor of red, white, and green with the crowned small coat of arms in the center.	2:3
	mid/late 1946 – 20 August 1949	Flag of the Hungarian Republic	A horizontal tricolor of red, white, and green with the state ("Kossuth") coat of arms in the center.	1:2
	mid/late 1946 – 20 August 1949	Flag of the Hungarian Republic	A horizontal tricolor of red, white, and green with the state ("Kossuth") coat of arms in the center.	2:3
	20 August 1949 – 12 November 1956	Flag of the Hungarian People's Republic	A horizontal tricolor of red, white, and green with the state ("Rákosi") coat of arms in the center.	1:2
	20 August 1949 – 12 November 1956	Flag of the Hungarian People's Republic	A horizontal tricolor of red, white, and green with the state ("Rákosi") coat of arms in the center.	2:3
	23 October – 10 November 1956	Flag used by Hungarians revolting against the Hungarian People's Republic	This flag, from which the Rákosi era coat of arms has been cut out, became the symbol of the Hungarian Revolution of 1956.	1:2
	23 October – 10 November 1956	Flag used by Hungarians revolting against the Hungarian People's Republic	This flag, from which the Rákosi era coat of arms has been cut out, became the symbol of the Hungarian Revolution of 1956.	2:3
	12 November 1956 – 23 May 1957	Flag of the Hungarian People's Republic	A horizontal tricolor of red, white, and green with the state ("Kossuth") coat of arms in the center.	1:2
	12 November 1956 – 23 May 1957	Flag of the Hungarian People's Republic	A horizontal tricolor of red, white, and green with the state ("Kossuth") coat of arms in the center.	2:3
	23 May 1957 – 20 August 2000	Flag of the Hungarian People's Republic and the Hungarian Republic	A horizontal tricolor of red, white, and green.	2:3
	20 March 1786 – 1 August 1869	Civil ensign of the Kingdom of Hungary as part of the Habsburg Monarchy, the Austrian Empire, and the Austro-Hungarian Empire	A horizontal triband of red, white, and red with the Austrian escutcheon on the hoist side.	2:3
	1 August 1869 – November 1918	Civil ensign of Transleithania as part of the Austro-Hungarian Empire (for maritime navigation)	A horizontal triband of red, white, and red / green with the Austrian escutcheon on the hoist side and the crowned small coat of arms of Hungary on the fly side.	2:3
	12 January 1896 – 6 November 1915	Civil and state ensign of Transleithania (for inland navigation)	A horizontal tricolor of red, white, and green with the combined coat of arms of the Lands of the Holy Hungarian Crown in the center.	2:3
	6 November 1915 – 29 November 1918	Civil and state ensign of Transleithania (for inland navigation)	A horizontal tricolor of red, white, and green with the combined coat of arms of the Lands of the Holy Hungarian Crown in the center.	2:3
	14 October 1921 – mid/late 1946	Civil ensign of the Kingdom of Hungary	A horizontal tricolor of red, white, and green with the crowned small coat of arms on the hoist side.	2:3
	4 November 1950 – 18 August 1957	Civil ensign of the Hungarian People's Republic	A horizontal tricolor of red, white, and green with the state ("Rákosi") coat of arms in the center.	2:3
	1957–1990	State ensign of the Hungarian People's Republic	A horizontal tricolor of red, white, and green with the state ("Kádár") coat of arms in the center.	2:3
	6 November 1915 – 29 November 1918, August 1919 – mid/late 1946	Flag of the Kingdom of Hungary and the Hungarian Republic (vertical version)	A vertical tricolor of red, white, and green with the crowned small coat of arms in the middle of the white field.	2:1
	6 November 1915 – 29 November 1918, August 1919 – mid/late 1946	Flag of the Kingdom of Hungary and the Hungarian Republic (vertical version)	A vertical tricolor of red, white, and green with the crowned small coat of arms flanked by two angels in the center.	2:1
	20 August 1949 – 12 November 1956	Flag of the Hungarian People's Republic (vertical version)	A vertical tricolor of red, white, and green with the state ("Rákosi") coat of arms in the middle of the white field.	2:1
	20 August 1949 – 12 November 1956	Flag of the Hungarian People's Republic (vertical version)	A vertical tricolor of red, white, and green with the state ("Rákosi") coat of arms in the center.	2:1
	20 August 1949 – 12 November 1956	Flag of the Hungarian People's Republic (vertical version)	A horizontal tricolor of red, white, and green with the state ("Rákosi") coat of arms in the center.	2:1

=== Governmental flags ===
Flag	Date	Use	Description	Ratio
	1920s–1939	Ensign of the regent of Hungary and members of the Royal Hungarian Government	A white flag bordered with a red and green "wolf-teeth" pattern, charged with the crowned small coat of arms framed by oak and olive branches in the center.	1:1
	1948–1950	Ensign of the president of Hungary	A white swallow-tailed flag bordered with a red and green "wolf-teeth" pattern, charged with the state ("Kossuth") coat of arms framed by oak and olive branches and two crossed sabers on the hoist side.	2:3
	1990s–2012	Standard of the president of Hungary	A white flag bordered with a red and green "wolf-teeth" pattern, charged with the state coat of arms in the center.	1:1
	1950s–1955	Enisgn of the Minister of Defence of Hungary	A white swallow-tailed flag bordered with a red and green "flame" pattern, charged with a horizontal triband of red, white, and green and the state ("Rákosi") coat of arms on the hoist side.	2:3
	1896–1915	Flag of the common ministries of the Lands of the Holy Hungarian Crown	A horizontal tricolor of red, white, and green with the combined coat of arms of the Lands of the Holy Hungarian Crown in the center.	1:2
	1896–1915	Flag of the common ministries of the Lands of the Holy Hungarian Crown	A horizontal tricolor of red, white, and green with the combined coat of arms of the Lands of the Holy Hungarian Crown in the center.	2:3
	1896–1915	Flag of the common ministries of the Lands of the Holy Hungarian Crown	A horizontal tricolor of red, white, and green with the combined coat of arms of the Lands of the Holy Hungarian Crown flanked by two angels in the center.	1:2
	1896–1915	Flag of the common ministries of the Lands of the Holy Hungarian Crown	A horizontal tricolor of red, white, and green with the combined coat of arms of the Lands of the Holy Hungarian Crown flanked by two angels in the center.	2:3
	1896–1915	Flag of the common ministries of the Lands of the Holy Hungarian Crown	A horizontal tricolor of red, white, and green with the combined coat of arms of the Lands of the Holy Hungarian Crown flanked by two angels in the center.	1:4
	1915–1918	Flag of the common ministries of the Lands of the Holy Hungarian Crown	A horizontal tricolor of red, white, and green with the combined coat of arms of the Lands of the Holy Hungarian Crown in the center.	1:2
	1915–1918	Flag of the common ministries of the Lands of the Holy Hungarian Crown	A horizontal tricolor of red, white, and green with the combined coat of arms of the Lands of the Holy Hungarian Crown in the center.	2:3
	1896–1915	Customs ensign	A horizontal tricolor of red, white, and green with the combined coat of arms of the Lands of the Holy Hungarian Crown in the center. The inscription below the coat of arms reads: "M. K. Pénzügyőrség" (Royal Hungarian Finance Guard).	2:3
	1915–1918	Customs ensign	A horizontal tricolor of red, white, and green with the combined coat of arms of the Lands of the Holy Hungarian Crown in the center. The inscription below the coat of arms reads: "M. K. Pénzügyőrség" (Royal Hungarian Finance Guard).	2:3
	1924–1925	Pilot flag	A white flag with a blue fouled anchor topped with the Holy Crown of Hungary in the center.	1:1
	1925–1946	Flag of the river police	A white flag with a blue fouled anchor topped with the Holy Crown of Hungary in the center.	1:1
	1925–1946	Pilot flag	A white flag with a blue fouled anchor topped with the Holy Crown of Hungary in the center and a blue capital letter "K" in the canton.	1:1

=== Military flags ===
Flag	Date	Use	Description	Ratio
	1939–1945	Flag and ensign of the Supreme Warlord of the Royal Hungarian Army	A white flag bordered with a red and green "wolf-teeth" pattern, charged with the combined coat of arms of the Lands of the Holy Hungarian Crown flanked by two angels in the center.	5:7
	1939–1945	Flag and ensign of the Supreme Warlord of the Royal Hungarian Army	A white flag bordered with a red and green "wolf-teeth" pattern, charged with the combined coat of arms of the Lands of the Holy Hungarian Crown flanked by two angels in the center.	2:3
	1939–1945	Flag and ensign of the Commander-in-Chief / commander of an army of the Royal Hungarian Army	A white flag bordered with a red and green "flame" pattern, charged with the crowned small coat of arms flanked by two angels in the center.	8:11
	1939–1945	Flag and ensign of the Commander-in-Chief / commander of an army of the Royal Hungarian Army	A white flag bordered with a red and green "flame" pattern, charged with the crowned small coat of arms flanked by two angels in the center.	2:3
	1939–1945	Flag and ensign of the commander of a corps of the Royal Hungarian Army	A white flag bordered with a red and green "flame" pattern, charged with the crowned small coat of arms framed by oak and olive branches in the center.	8:11
	1939–1945	Flag and ensign of the commander of a corps of the Royal Hungarian Army	A white flag bordered with a red and green "flame" pattern, charged with the crowned small coat of arms framed by oak and olive branches in the center.	2:3
	1940–1945	Flag and ensign of the Chief of the Honvéd General Staff	A white flag bordered with a red and green "flame" pattern, charged with the combined coat of arms of the Lands of the Holy Hungarian Crown framed by oak and olive branches in the center.	8:11
	1940–1945	Flag and ensign of the Chief of the Honvéd General Staff	A white flag bordered with a red and green "flame" pattern, charged with the combined coat of arms of the Lands of the Holy Hungarian Crown framed by oak and olive branches in the center.	2:3
	1919–1920	Flag of the Supreme Command of the Hungarian National Army	A horizontal tricolor of red, white, and green bordered with a red, white, and green "wolf-teeth" pattern, charged with the initials "F. V." in the middle of the white field.	7:10
	1919–1920s	Division headquarters flag	A swallow-tailed horizontal tricolor of red, white, and green charged with the initial "H." in the middle of the white field.	5:8
	1919–1920s	Cavalry division headquarters guidon	A swallow-tailed horizontal tricolor of red, white, and green charged with the initials "L. H." in the middle of the white field.	5:8
	1919–1920s	Brigade headquarters flag	A triangular pennant of red, white, and green charged with the initial "D." in the middle of the white field.	4:5
	1919–1920s	Cavalry brigade headquarters guidon	A triangular pennant of red, white, and green charged with the initials "L. D." in the middle of the white field.	4:5
	1920s–1930s	Flag of the Royal Hungarian High Command	A white swallow-tailed flag with a red disk superimposed on a green cross in the center.	4:7
	1920s–1930s	Army headquarters flag of the Royal Hungarian Army	A white swallow-tailed flag with a white-fimbriated vertical green stripe on a red field in the center.	4:7
	1920s–1930s	Corps headquarters flag	A white swallow-tailed flag with a vertical triband of red, white, and green in the center.	4:7
	1920s–1930s	Division headquarters flag	A triangular green pennant bordered with red and white stripes.	c. 2:3
	1920s–1930s	Infantry headquarters flag	A flag with a green triangle based on the fly side, its point reaching the midpoint of the hoist edge. The triangle has a very thick white border. The remaining triangles at the top and bottom of the hoist are red.	13:9
	1920s–1930s	Infantry regiment headquarters flag	A green flag with three separate pairs of horizontal bands, each pair being red above white.	11:9
	1920s–1930s	Independent infantry battalion headquarters flag	A green flag with two separate pairs of horizontal bands, each pair being red above white.	11:9
	1920s–1930s	Cavalry division headquarters flag	A triangular light blue pennant bordered with green, white and red stripes.	c. 2:3
	1920s–1930s	Cavalry brigade headquarters flag	A flag with a light blue triangle based on the fly side, its point reaching the midpoint of the hoist edge. The triangle has a thick border of red and then white. The remaining triangles at the top and bottom of the hoist are green.	13:9
	1920s–1930s	Cavalry regiment headquarters flag	A light blue flag with three separate groups of three horizontal bands; each group being red, white, and green.	11:9
	1920s–1930s	Independent cavalry battalion headquarters flag	A light blue flag with two separate groups of three horizontal bands, each group being red, white, and green.	11:9
	1920s–1930s	Artillery headquarters flag	A flag with a red triangle based on the fly side, its point reaching the midpoint of the hoist edge. The triangle has a very thick white border. The remaining triangles at the top and bottom of the hoist are green.	13:9
	1920s–1930s	Artillery regiment headquarters flag	A red flag with three separate pairs of horizontal bands, each pair being white over green.	11:9
	1920s–1930s	Independent artillery battalion headquarters flag	A red flag with two separate pairs of horizontal bands, each pair being white over green.	11:9
	1920s–1930s	Signal stations' flag	A white flag with the inscription "HIR" in the center.	11:9
	1920s–1930s	Field hospitals' flag	A white flag with a red cross in the center.	11:9
	1920s–1930s	Ammunition depots' flag	A red-bordered white flag.	11:9
	1920s–1930s	Rations depots' flag	A yellow-bordered white flag.	11:9
	1930s–1945	Flag of the Royal Hungarian High Command	A white flag with a red disk superimposed on a green cross in the center.	2:3
	1930s–1945	Army headquarters flag of the Royal Hungarian Army	A white flag with a white-fimbriated vertical green stripe on a red field in the center.	2:3
	1930s–1945	Corps headquarters flag	A white flag with a vertical triband of red, white, and green in the center.	2:3
	1930s–1945	Division headquarters flag	A triangular pennant of red, white, and green.	2:3
	1930s–1945	Independent or mountain brigade headquarters flag	A white square flag with a green triangle based on the fly side.	1:1
	1930s–1945	Motorised infantry brigade headquarters flag	A white square flag with a green triangle bearing a white disk with a black steering wheel.	1:1
	1930s–1945	Infantry regiment or independent battalion headquarters flag	A green square flag charged with a white disk with two crossed rifles in the center.	1:1
	1930s–1945	Motorised infantry regiment or battalion headquarters flag	A green square flag charged with a white disk with a black steering wheel in the center.	1:1
	1930s–1945	Cavalry brigade headquarters flag	A white square flag with a light blue triangle based on the fly side.	1:1
	1930s–1945	Cavalry regiment or independent battalion headquarters flag	A light blue square flag charged with a white disk with two crossed sabers in the center.	1:1
	1930s–1945	Artillery commanders' flag	A white square flag with a red triangle based on the fly side.	1:1
	1930s–1945	Artillery regiment or battalion headquarters flag	A red square flag charged with a white disk bearing a field gun and artillery equipment in the center.	1:1
	1930s–1945	Armoured brigade headquarters flag	A white square flag charged with a blue triangle bearing a white disk with a black steering wheel.	1:1
	1930s–1945	Armoured regiment or battalion headquarters flag	A blue square flag charged with a white disk with a black steering wheel in the center.	1:1
	1930s–1945	Air brigade headquarters flag	A white square flag charged with a black-bordered white triangle bearing a stylized bird.	1:1
	1930s–1945	Air regiment or independent battalion headquarters flag	A white square flag charged with a stylized bird in the center.	1:1
	1930s–1945	River brigade headquarters flag	A white square flag charged with a black-bordered white triangle bearing a black anchor.	1:1
	1930s–1945	Horse-drawn supply train group headquarters flag	A brown square flag charged with a white circle divided into six equal parts in the center.	1:1
	1930s–1945	Motorized supply train group headquarters flag	A brown square flag charged with a white circle divided into six equal parts and a black steering wheel in the center.	1:1
	1930s–1945	Fuel depots' flag	A brown square flag charged with a black-bordered disk bearing a black steering wheel in the middle of a white square.	1:1
	1930s–1945	Signal stations' flag	A white square flag with the inscription "HIR" in the center.	1:1
	1930s–1945	Field hospitals' flag	A white square flag with a red cross in the center.	1:1
	1930s–1945	Veterinary field hospitals' flag	A white square flag with a blue cross in the center.	1:1
	1930s–1945	Ammunition depots' flag	A diagonal quartered flag of white and red.	1:1
	1930s–1945	Rations depots' flag	A quartered flag of yellow and white.	1:1
	1901–1945	Flag of the Royal Hungarian Ludovica Military Academy	A white flag bordered with a red and green "flame" pattern, charged with the combined coat of arms of the Lands of the Holy Hungarian Crown flanked by two angels in the center.	c. 6:7

==== War flags ====
Flag	Date	Use	Description	Ratio
	1939–1945	War flag	A horizontal tricolor of red, white, and green with the crowned small coat of arms framed by oak and olive branches in the center.	3:10
	1939–1945	War flag	A horizontal tricolor of red, white, and green with the crowned small coat of arms framed by oak and olive branches in the center.	3:8
	1939–1945	War flag	A horizontal tricolor of red, white, and green with the crowned small coat of arms framed by oak and olive branches in the center.	1:2
	1939–1945	War flag	A horizontal tricolor of red, white, and green with the crowned small coat of arms framed by oak and olive branches in the center.	2:5
	1939–1945	War flag	A horizontal tricolor of red, white, and green with the crowned small coat of arms framed by oak and olive branches in the center.	3:5

==== Army flags ====
Flag	Date	Use	Description	Ratio
	1458–1494	Standard of the Black Army of Hungary	A red swallow-tailed flag divided into four quarters: ten horizontal stripes alternating white and red in first and fourth quarters and a white lion in the second and third quarters.	—
	1458–1494	Standard of the Black Army of Hungary	A red swallow-tailed flag divided into four quarters: ten horizontal stripes alternating black and red in first and fourth quarters and a black lion in the second and third quarters.	—
	1848–1849	Infantry colour of the Honvéd Army	A white flag bordered with a red and green "wolf-teeth" pattern, charged with the crowned small coat of arms in the center.	—
	1868–1938	Infantry colour of the Royal Hungarian Landwehr and the Royal Hungarian Army	A white flag bordered with a red and green "flame" pattern, charged with the combined coat of arms of the Lands of the Holy Hungarian Crown flanked by two angels in the center.	132:155
	1868–1938	Infantry colour of the Royal Hungarian Landwehr and the Royal Hungarian Army (reverse)	A white flag bordered with a red and green "flame" pattern, charged with the royal cypher of Franz Joseph I surmounted by the Holy Crown of Hungary in the center.	132:155
	1868–1918	Infantry colour of the Royal Croatian Home Guard	A white flag bordered with a red and blue "flame" pattern, charged with the combined coat of arms of the Lands of the Holy Hungarian Crown flanked by two angels in the center.	132:155
	1868–1918	Infantry colour of the Royal Croatian Home Guard (reverse)	A white flag bordered with a red and blue "flame" pattern, charged with the royal cypher of Franz Joseph I surmounted by the Holy Crown of Hungary in the center.	132:155
	1939–1945	Infantry colour of the Royal Hungarian Army	A white flag bordered with a red and green "flame" pattern, charged with the combined coat of arms of the Lands of the Holy Hungarian Crown flanked by two angels in the center.	6:7
	1945–1946	Infantry colour of the 1st Infantry Division of the Hungarian Defence Force	A white flag bordered with a red and green "flame" pattern, charged with the crowned small coat of arms in the center.	6:7
	1946–1949	Infantry colour of the 1st Infantry Division of the Hungarian Defence Force	A white flag bordered with a red and green "flame" pattern, charged with the crownless small coat of arms in the center.	6:7
	1949	Infantry colour and armoured regiments' standard of the Hungarian Defence Force	A white flag bordered with a red and green "flame" pattern, charged with the state ("Kossuth") coat of arms framed by oak and olive branches in the center.	6:7
	1949–1950	Infantry colour and armoured regiments' standard of the Hungarian Defence Force	A white flag bordered with a red and green "flame" pattern, charged with the state ("Rákosi") coat of arms in the center.	6:7
	1950–1957	Infantry colour and armoured regiments' standard of the Hungarian People's Army	A red flag bordered with a white and green "wolf-teeth" pattern, charged with the state ("Rákosi") coat of arms in the center.	6:7
	1956	Colour of the 26th Rifle Regiment during the Hungarian Revolution of 1956	A red flag bordered with a white and green "wolf-teeth" pattern, with the state ("Rákosi") coat of arms cut out from the center.	6:7
	1957–1990	Infantry colour of the Hungarian People's Army	A red flag bordered with a white and green "wolf-teeth" pattern, charged with the state ("Kádár") coat of arms in the center.	6:7
	1957–1976	Armoured regiments' standard of the Hungarian People's Army	A red flag bordered with a white and green "wolf-teeth" pattern, charged with the state ("Kádár") coat of arms in the center.	6:7
	1939–1945	Bicycle and motorised infantry battalions' standard of the Royal Hungarian Army	A white flag bordered with a red and green "flame" pattern, charged with the combined coat of arms of the Lands of the Holy Hungarian Crown flanked by two angels in the center.	1:1
	1939–1945	Cavalry standard of the Royal Hungarian Army	A white flag bordered with a red and green "flame" pattern, charged with the combined coat of arms of the Lands of the Holy Hungarian Crown flanked by two angels in the center.	1:1
	1949	Cavalry standard of the Hungarian Defence Force	A white flag bordered with a red and green "flame" pattern, charged with the state ("Kossuth") coat of arms framed by oak and olive branches in the center.	1:1
	1949–1950	Cavalry standard of the Hungarian Defence Force	A white flag bordered with a red and green "flame" pattern, charged with the state ("Rákosi") coat of arms in the center.	1:1
	1950–1957	Cavalry standard of the Hungarian People's Army	A red flag bordered with a white and green "wolf-teeth" pattern, charged with the state ("Rákosi") coat of arms in the center.	1:1
	1957–1976	Cavalry standard of the Hungarian People's Army	A red flag bordered with a white and green "wolf-teeth" pattern, charged with the state ("Kádár") coat of arms in the center.	1:1

==== Naval flags ====
Flag	Date	Use	Description	Ratio
	1786–1915	Naval ensign of the Danube Flotilla of the Imperial and Royal Navy	A horizontal triband of red, white, and red with the Austrian escutcheon on the hoist side.	2:3
	1915–1918	Naval ensign of the Danube Flotilla of the Imperial and Royal Navy	A horizontal triband of red, white, and red with the Austrian escutcheon on the hoist side and the dexter half of the Hungarian coat of arms on the fly side. Approved in 1915 by the October 11th decree of Franz Jeseph I, but the installation was postponed to the time following the war, because the death of the Emperor.	2:3
	1919	Naval ensign of the Danube Guard	A plain red flag.	2:3
	1921–1939	Naval ensign of the Royal Hungarian River Guard	A horizontal tricolor of red, white, and green with the crowned small coat of arms on the hoist side.	2:3
	1939–1945	Naval ensign of the Royal Hungarian Army River Forces	A horizontal tricolor of red, white, and green with the combined coat of arms of the Lands of the Holy Hungarian Crown framed by oak and olive branches on the hoist side.	10:17
	1946–1948	Naval ensign of the Honvéd River Guard	A horizontal tricolor of red, white, and green with the state coat of arms framed by oak and olive branches on the hoist side.	10:17
	1948–1950	Naval ensign of the Honvéd River Guard	A white flag bordered with a red and green "wolf-teeth" pattern, charged with the state ("Kossuth") coat of arms in the center.	2:3
	1950–1955	Naval ensign of the Honvéd River Flotilla	A white flag bordered with a red and green "flame" pattern, charged with a horizontal triband of red, white, and green and the state ("Rákosi") coat of arms on the hoist side.	2:3
	1955–1957	Naval ensign of the Honvéd River Flotilla	A red flag bordered with a white and green "wolf-teeth" pattern, charged with the state ("Rákosi") coat of arms on the hoist side.	2:3
	1957–1991	Naval ensign of the Honvéd River Flotilla	A red flag bordered with a white and green "wolf-teeth" pattern, charged with the state ("Kádár") coat of arms on the hoist side.	2:3
	1894–1915	Naval jack of the Danube Flotilla of the Imperial and Royal Navy	A horizontal triband of red, white, and red with the Austrian escutcheon on the hoist side.	4:5
	1915–1918	Naval jack of the Danube Flotilla of the Imperial and Royal Navy	A horizontal triband of red, white, and red with the Austrian escutcheon on the hoist side and the dexter half of the Hungarian coat of arms on the fly side.	4:5
	1919	Naval jack of the Danube Guard	A plain red flag.	4:5
	1921–1945	Naval jack of the Royal Hungarian River Guard / Royal Hungarian Army River Forces	A horizontal tricolor of red, white, and green.	4:5
	1921–1939	Naval jack of the Royal Hungarian River Guard	A horizontal tricolor of red, white, and green with the crowned small coat of arms in the center.	4:5
	1939–1945	Naval jack of the Royal Hungarian Army River Forces	A horizontal tricolor of red, white, and green with the combined coat of arms of the Lands of the Holy Hungarian Crown framed by oak and olive branches in the center.	4:5
	1948–1950	Naval jack of the Honvéd River Guard	A white flag bordered with a red and green "wolf-teeth" pattern, charged with the state ("Kossuth") coat of arms framed by oak and olive branches in the center.	3:4
	1950–1955	Naval jack of the Honvéd River Flotilla	A white flag bordered with a red and green "flame" pattern, charged with a horizontal triband of red, white, and green and the state ("Rákosi") coat of arms on the hoist side.	3:4
	1955–1957	Naval jack of the Honvéd River Flotilla	A red flag bordered with a white and green "wolf-teeth" pattern, charged with the state ("Rákosi") coat of arms on the hoist side.	c. 6:7
	1957–1991	Naval jack of the Honvéd River Flotilla	A red flag bordered with a white and green "wolf-teeth" pattern, charged with the state ("Kádár") coat of arms on the hoist side.	c. 6:7
	1921–1939	Ensign of the commander of the Royal Hungarian River Guard	A horizontal tricolor of red, white, and green bordered with a red, white, and green "wolf-teeth" pattern, charged with the crowned small coat of arms on the hoist side.	2:3
	1939–1945	Ensign of the commander of the Royal Hungarian Army River Forces	A white flag bordered with a red and green "flame" pattern, charged with the crowned small coat of arms framed by oak and olive branches on the hoist side.	10:13
	1921–1939	Senior Commander's pennant of the Royal Hungarian River Guard	A triangular pennant of red, white, and green.	3:4
	1939–1945	Senior Commander's pennant of the Royal Hungarian Army River Forces	A triangular pennant of red, white, and green with the Holy Crown of Hungary in the center.	3:4
	1948–1950	Senior Commander's pennant of the Honvéd River Guard	A white triangular pennant bordered with a red and green "wolf-teeth" pattern, charged with the state ("Kossuth") coat of arms framed by oak and olive branches on the hoist side.	3:4
	1950–1955	Senior Commander's pennant of the Honvéd River Flotilla	A white triangular pennant bordered with a red and green "flame" pattern, charged with a horizontal triband of red, white, and green and the state ("Rákosi") coat of arms on the hoist side.	3:4
	1955–1957	Senior Commander's pennant of the Honvéd River Flotilla	A red triangular pennant bordered with a white and green "wolf-teeth" pattern, charged with the state ("Rákosi") coat of arms on the hoist side.	3:4
	1957–1991	Senior Commander's pennant of the Honvéd River Flotilla	A red triangular pennant bordered with a white and green "wolf-teeth" pattern, charged with the state ("Kádár") coat of arms on the hoist side.	3:4
	1955–1957	Ministerial pennant of the Honvéd River Flotilla	A red swallow-tailed pennant bordered with a white and green "wolf-teeth" pattern, charged with the state ("Rákosi") coat of arms on the hoist side.	3:4
	1957–1991	Ministerial pennant of the Honvéd River Flotilla	A red swallow-tailed pennant bordered with a white and green "wolf-teeth" pattern, charged with the state ("Kádár") coat of arms on the hoist side.	3:4
	1921–1945	Masthead pennant	A triangular pennant of red, white, and green.	1:30
	1948–1991	Masthead pennant	A triangular pennant of red, white, and green.	3:40

=== Subdivision flags ===
Flag	Date	Use	Description	Ratio
	1868–1918	Flag of the Kingdom of Croatia-Slavonia	A horizontal tricolor of red, white, and blue.	2:3
	1868–1918	Flag of the Kingdom of Croatia-Slavonia	A horizontal tricolor of red, white, and blue with the coat of arms of Croatia-Slavonia in the center.	2:3
	1868–1918	Flag of the Kingdom of Croatia-Slavonia	A horizontal tricolor of red, white, and blue with the coat of arms of Croatia-Slavonia in the center.	1:2
	1867–1918	Flag of Transylvania	A horizontal tricolor of blue, red, and yellow.	2:3
	1939–1941	Unofficial flag of the Governorate of Subcarpathia	A horizontal bicolor of blue and yellow.	2:3
	1941–1944	Flag of the Governorate of Subcarpathia	A horizontal bicolor of blue and red.	2:3
	1991–2010	Flag of Zala County	A horizontal bicolor of yellow and green with the county's coat of arms and the inscription "ZALA MEGYE" (Zala County) in the center.	1:2

==== Municipal flags ====
Flag	Date	Use	Description	Ratio
	1703–1873	Flag of Buda	A horizontal tricolor of red, white, and green.	2:3
	1703–1873	Flag of Pest	A horizontal tricolor of red, yellow, and sky blue.	2:3
	1873–1930	Flag of Budapest	A horizontal tricolor of red, yellow, and sky blue.	2:3
	1930–1949	Flag of Budapest	A horizontal tricolor of red, yellow, and green.	2:3
	1930–1949	Flag of Budapest	A vertical tricolor of red, yellow, and green.	2:1
	1984–1990	Flag of Budapest	A white flag with the city's coat of arms in the center.	2:3
	1984–1990	Flag of Budapest	A white flag with the city's coat of arms in the center.	2:1
	1990–2011	Flag of Budapest	A horizontal tricolor of red, yellow, and sky blue with the city's coat of arms in the center.	2:3
	1990–2011	Flag of Budapest	A horizontal tricolor of red, yellow, and sky blue with the city's coat of arms in the center.	2:1
	2011	Flag of Budapest	A white flag bordered with a red and green "wolf-teeth" pattern, charged with the city's coat of arms in the center.	2:3
	2011	Flag of Budapest	A white flag bordered with a red and green "wolf-teeth" pattern, charged with the city's coat of arms in the center.	2:1

=== Other flags ===
Flag	Date	Use	Description	Ratio
	1921	Flag of Lajtabánság	A horizontal tricolor of red, white, and green with the coat of arms of Lajtabánság in the center.	1:2

==== Political flags ====
Flag	Date	Use	Description	Ratio
	1932–1933	Flag of the Hungarian National Socialist Agricultural Labourers' and Workers' Party	A horizontal tricolor of red, white, and green with the outline of Greater Hungary superimposed over a green swastika in the center.	2:3
	1932–1939	Flag of the Party of National Unity	A white flag with a red capital letter "V" in the fly, charged with the party emblem in the center.	1:2
	1939–1949	Flag of the National Peasant Party	A black flag with a black sickle on a red disc in the center.	
	1935–1946	Flag of the National Organization of Catholic Agricultural Youth Clubs (KALOT)^{hu}		
	1937–1942	Flag of the Arrow Cross Party	A red flag with a green arrow cross on a white disk in the center.	2:3
	1942–1945	Flag of the Arrow Cross Party	A red flag with a green arrow cross on a white rhombus in the center.	5:7
	1942–1945	Flag of the Hungarist Movement	Nine horizontal stripes alternating red and white with a vertical red band charged with a green arrow cross on a white rhombus on the hoist side.	17:35
	1938–1945	Flag of the People's Association of Germans in Hungary (Volksbund)	A white flag with a yellow sun cross on a red-bordered white disk in the center.	2:3
	1938–1945	Flag of the People's Association of Germans in Hungary (Volksbund)	A white flag with a yellow swastika on a red-bordered white disk in the center.	2:3
	1938–1945	Flag of the People's Association of Germans in Hungary (Volksbund)	A white flag with a yellow swastika on a red-bordered white disk in the center.	2:1
	1941–1945	Flag of the German Youth (Deutsche Jugend) of the People's Association of Germans in Hungary (Volksbund).	A horizontal triband of red, white, and red with a black swastika on a white disk in the center.	1:2
	1944–1948	Flag of the Hungarian Communist Party	A red flag with the party emblem in the center.	2:3
	1948–1956	Flag of the Hungarian Working People's Party	A horizontal tricolor of red, white, and green with a yellow-bordered red star superimposed over an ear of wheat in the center.	2:3
	1950–1956	Flag of the Union of Working Youth	A horizontal tricolor of red, white, and green with a yellow-bordered red star bearing the acronym "DISZ" in the center.	2:3
	1950–1956	Flag of the Union of Working Youth	A horizontal tricolor of red, white, and green with the logo of the organization in the center.	1:2
	1989–2016	Flag of the Hungarian National Front	Seven horizontal stripes alternating red and white with a vertical black stripe at the hoist, charged with a white capital letter "H" on a white-bordered rhombus and the acronym "MNA".	2:3
	1993–2000	Flag of the Hungarian Welfare Association	A red flag with a black gear on a white disk in the center.	1:2
	1994	Flag of the Hungarian Hungarist Movement	Seven horizontal stripes alternating red and white with a red ten-pointed star on a white disk in the center.	1:2
	1990s–2012	Flag of the Workers' Party / Hungarian Communist Workers' Party	A red flag with the inscription "Munkáspárt" (Workers' Party) and the party emblem on the fly side.	3:5
	1999–2008	Flag of the Young Left-wing	A white and red flag charged with the inscription "Fiatal Baloldal" (Young Left-wing).	1:2
	2000s	Flag of the Civic Circles	A horizontal tricolor of red, white, and green with the inscription "Hajrá magyarok!" (Go Hungarians!) in the middle of the white field.	1:2
	2004–2005	Flag of the Hungarian Future Group	Nine horizontal stripes alternating red and white with a green arrow cross bearing a white Hungarian rune "" (letter "H") on a white rhombus in the center.	1:2
	2009–2014	Flag of the Politics Can Be Different	A white flag with the party emblem in the center.	2:3
	2013–2016	Flag of the Dialogue for Hungary	A white flag with the party emblem in the center.	2:3
	2008–2017	Pax Hungarica Movement	Nine horizontal stripes alternating red and white with a white capital letter "H" superimposed over a white-bordered green rhombus on a vertical red stripe on the hoist side.	1:2

==== Organization flags ====
Flag	Date	Use	Description	Ratio
	1940–1944	Pennant of the Levente Associations' Headquarters of Miklósvár District	A triangular pennant of red, white, and green with a red and green "wolf-teeth" pattern at the hoist, charged with the emblem of the Levente Associations, a green-bordered white disk bearing the inscription "Háromszék vm." (Háromszék County) and the county's coat of arms, and a red-bordered white disk with the circumscription "M. kir. miklósvár-i járás-i levente parancsnokság" (Levente headquarters of the Royal Hungarian District of Miklósvár).	c. 1:2
	1990s	Flag of the Hungarian State Railways	A horizontal bicolor of blue and yellow with the company's logo in the center of the yellow field.	2:3
	1990s	Flag of the Hungarian State Railways	A horizontal bicolor of blue and yellow with the company's logo in the center of the yellow field.	3:2
	1994–2003	Flag of the Hungarian Flag Society	Six vertical bands of red, white, green, yellow, black, and blue.	2:3

==== House flags ====
Flag	Date	Use	Description	Ratio
	1960s–2000s	House flag of the Hungarian Shipping Company (MAHART)^{hu}	A white triangular pennant charged with a blue fouled anchor superimposed on a horizontal triband of red, white, and green.	3:5
	?–1991	House flag of the Danube-Sea Navigation Company (DTRT)		
	1882–1918	House flag of the Royal Hungarian Maritime Company "Adria"^{de}		

==== Yacht club flags ====
Flag	Date	Use	Description	Ratio
	1957–2000s	Ensign of the Hungarian Yachting Association	A red flag charged with a white-fimbriated green cross in the center.	2:3
	1960s–2000s	Ensign of Lake Velence Water Sports Association	A green flag charged with a red diagonal cross on a white field in the canton.	2:3
	1867–1884	Ensign of Balaton-Füredi Yacht Club	A red flag charged with the Holy Crown of Hungary superimposed on a white-fimbriated symmetric green cross and a white-fimbriated diagonal cross of green and white in the canton. Similar to the British Red Ensign.	2:3
	1867–1884	Burgee of Balaton-Füredi Yacht Club	A triangular red pennant charged with the Holy Crown of Hungary superimposed on a white-fimbriated green cross.	2:3
	1867–1884	Pennant of the Commodore of Balaton-Füredi Yacht Club	A red swallow-tailed pennant charged with the Holy Crown of Hungary superimposed on a white-fimbriated green cross.	2:3
	1867–1884	Pennant of the Vice Commodore of Balaton-Füredi Yacht Club	A red swallow-tailed pennant charged with a white disk in the canton and the Holy Crown of Hungary superimposed on a white-fimbriated green cross.	2:3
	1891–1918	Pennant of the Hungarian Vice Commodore of the Imperial and Royal Yacht Squadron	A white swallow-tailed pennant charged with the Imperial Crown of Austria superimposed on a green-fimbriated red cross and the crowned small coat of arms of Hungary in the canton.	2:3
	1891–1918	Pennant of the Hungarian Rear Commodore of the Imperial and Royal Yacht Squadron	A white swallow-tailed pennant charged with the Imperial Crown of Austria superimposed on a green-fimbriated red cross and a black fouled anchor in the canton.	2:3
	1891–1918	Pennant of Hungarian honorary members, founders and 1st class members of the Imperial and Royal Yacht Squadron	A triangular white pennant charged with the Imperial Crown of Austria superimposed on a green-fimbriated red cross and the crowned small coat of arms of Hungary in the canton.	2:3
	1891–1918	Pennant of Hungarian members of the Imperial and Royal Yacht Squadron	A triangular white pennant charged with the Imperial Crown of Austria superimposed on a green-fimbriated red cross and a black fouled anchor in the canton.	2:3
	1913–1948	Burgee of the Royal Hungarian Yacht Club	A triangular blue pennant charged with a white cross and the Holy Crown of Hungary in the canton.	3:5

==== Proposed flags ====
Flag	Date	Use	Description	Ratio
	1794	Ignác Martinovics's proposal	A horizontal tricolor of green, red, and white.	2:3
	1941	Sándor Széll's proposal	Seven horizontal stripes alternating red and white.	1:2
	1944	"Old Hungarian national flag" proposal by the Szálasi-government	Seven horizontal stripes alternating red and white.	1:2
	1949	Proposed flag for the Hungarian People's Republic	A horizontal tricolor of red, white, and green with a yellow-bordered red star in the center.	2:3
	1873	Proposed flag for Budapest	A horizontal tricolor of red, yellow, and sky blue with a horizontal triband of red, white, and green in the yellow field.	2:3
	1990	Proposed ceremonial ensign for the Honvéd River Flotilla	A white flag bordered with a red and green "wolf-teeth" pattern, charged with the state coat of arms framed by oak and olive branches on the hoist side.	2:3

== See also ==
- Flag of Hungary
- Flags of Hungarian history
- Coat of arms of Hungary
- National symbols of Hungary
