= Armorial of Hungary =

This gallery of Hungarian coats of arms shows the coats of arms of the Counties and certain Hungarian cities. They are used to visually identify historical and present-day counties, as well as cities, within Hungary.

== National ==
Coat of arms of Hungary

The coat of arms of Hungary was adopted on 3 July 1990, after the end of communist rule. The arms have been used before, both with and without the Holy Crown of Hungary, sometimes as part of a larger, more complex coat of arms, and its elements date back to the Middle Ages.

The shield is split into two parts:

- The dexter (the right side from the bearer's perspective, the left side from the viewer's) features the so-called Árpád stripes, four Gules (red) and four Argent (silver) stripes. Traditionally, the silver stripes represent four rivers: Duna (Danube), Tisza, Dráva, and Száva.
- The sinister (the left side from the bearer's perspective, the right side from the viewer's) consists of an Argent (silver) double cross on Gules (red) base, situated inside a small Or (golden) crown, the crown is placed on the middle heap of three Vert (green) hills, representing the mountain ranges (trimount) Tátra, Mátra, and Fátra.

Atop the shield rests the Holy Crown of St. Stephen (Stephen I of Hungary, István király), a crown that remains in the Parliament building (Országház) in Budapest today.

== See also ==
- Hungarian heraldry
