= Árpád stripes =

Hungarian heraldic configuration

Coat of arms of the Hungarian royal Árpád dynasty

Árpád stripes (Hungarian: Árpád-sávok) is the name of a particular heraldic and vexillologic configuration which has been in constant use since the early 13th century in particular in Hungarian heraldry. It can be seen in the left half of the current coat of arms of Hungary.

They have been associated with the founding dynasty of Hungary, with the House of Árpád, hence the name, but most later rulers and dynasties of Hungary adopted them in one form or another to stress their legitimacy to the Hungarian throne, e.g. by marshalling. The four silver stripes (often depicted as white) are sometimes claimed to symbolise "the four silver rivers" of Hungary—the Danube, Tisza, Sava and Drava.

The Árpád stripes are heraldically "barry of eight gules and argent".

== In heraldry ==
Coat of arms of Hungary: the left field of the shield features the so-called Árpád stripes

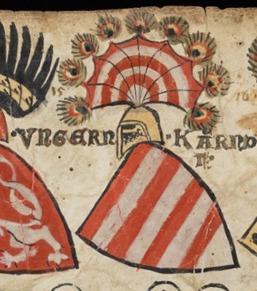
Zurich armorial scroll - The Hungarian royal Árpád dynasty's striped coat of arms from around 1340

The first depiction of the Árpád stripes appear on a coat of arms in 1202 in the seal of King Emeric of Hungary, member of the Árpád Dynasty, though a debated striped banner makes its appearance already on silver coins minted by Stephen I. roughly two centuries earlier. It has ever since formed part of the coat of arms of the ruling dynasties of Hungary and of the coat of arms of the Hungarian state, most of the time, as it does today, impaling gules, on a mount vert a crown Or, issuant therefrom a double cross argent or marshalled with the Angevins’ azure, semé-de-lis Or.

The Árpád stripes appear in many coat of arms of cities of the former Kingdom of Hungary, many of them now in the neighbouring countries of Hungary, such as Košice (Slovakia).

The modern heraldic use of the Árpád stripes is featured in the seal of the National Security Office of Hungary since 2001.

== In vexillology ==
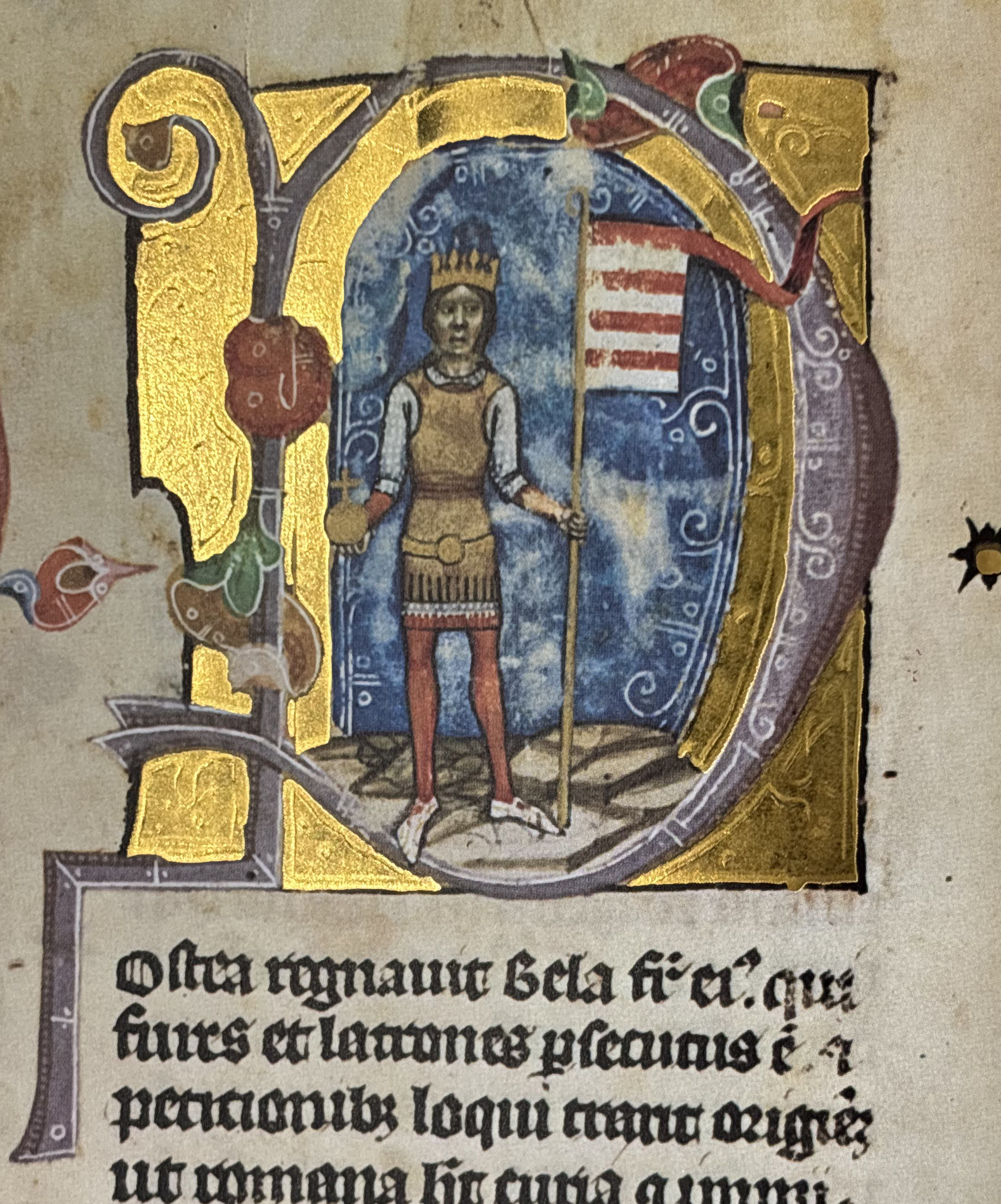
King Béla III of Hungary in Chronicon Pictum

The famous depiction of a banner with Árpád stripes showing King Béla III in one of the initials of the Chronicon Pictum dates to around 1360. The illustrations and decorative illuminations of the chronicle use the Árpád stripes on several occasion on banners (beside the mentioned initial it appears e.g. in the depiction of the Battle of Ménfő), shields, coat of arms (mostly marshalled with the Hungarian Apostolic Double Cross or the Angevin field azure semé-de-lis) or as the pattern of garment of Stephen I.

However, after the Middle Ages the use of the Árpád stripes as a flag fell out of use and was continued only in heraldry. It was revived only by the cavalry of Prince Francis II Rákóczi.

Today the banner of the House of Árpád as well as the banner of the cavalry of Francis II Rákóczi are part of the collection of historical flags of Hungary used for protocol (e.g. on state celebrations and holidays, MPs are sworn in on them in the Parliament, etc.).

Lately the flag has been adopted by the far-right (most eminently among supporters of Jobbik party) with increasing popularity since the 2006 protests in Hungary.

== Controversy ==
Flag of the Arrow Cross Party

Flag with the original configuration of the Árpád stripes, as seen also on the coat of arms of Hungary. This is also the form popularly used by Hungarian Right wing elements since the 1990s.

The recent use of the Árpád stripes both on flags and badges by Hungarian right wing elements have generated controversy, as the Nazi puppet government formed by members of the Hungarian Arrow Cross Party, which was in place for seven months (October 1944–April 1945), used a similar symbol as a component of their flag in the 1940s. The Árpád stripes are widely used by the contemporary Hungarian far right.

== Historical use ==
Seal of King Emeric (12th century)

Flag in the time of Béla III (12th century)

Seal of the Kings of Hungary of the Angevin dynasty (14th century)

Seal of King Vladislaus I (15th century)

Seal of King Matthias Corvinus (15th century)

Seal of King János Szapolyai (16th century)

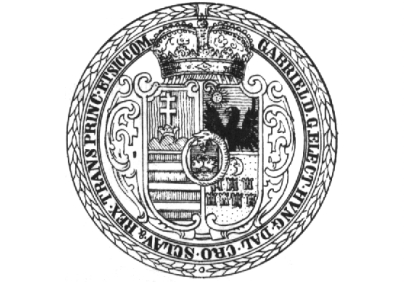
Seal of Gábor Bethlen (17th century)

Flag raised during Rákóczi's War of Independence (1703–1711)

== Current official use ==
Coat of arms of Hungary

Flag of Esztergom

Esztergom

Banská Bystrica (Hungarian: Besztercebánya), not part of Hungary since 1920

Dubrovnik, Croatia (the city was under Hungarian sovereignty from 14th to 16th century)

Budaörs

Flag of District III of Budapest

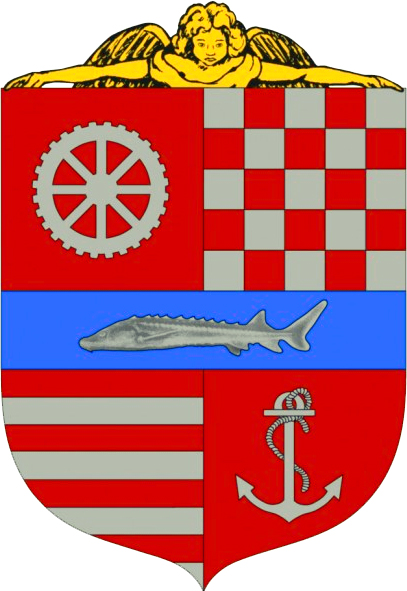
District XIII of Budapest

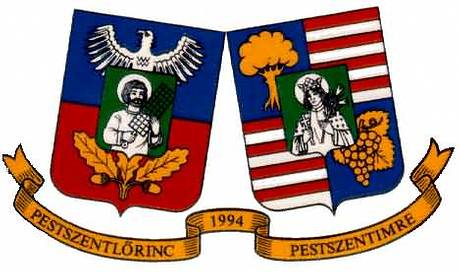
District XVIII of Budapest

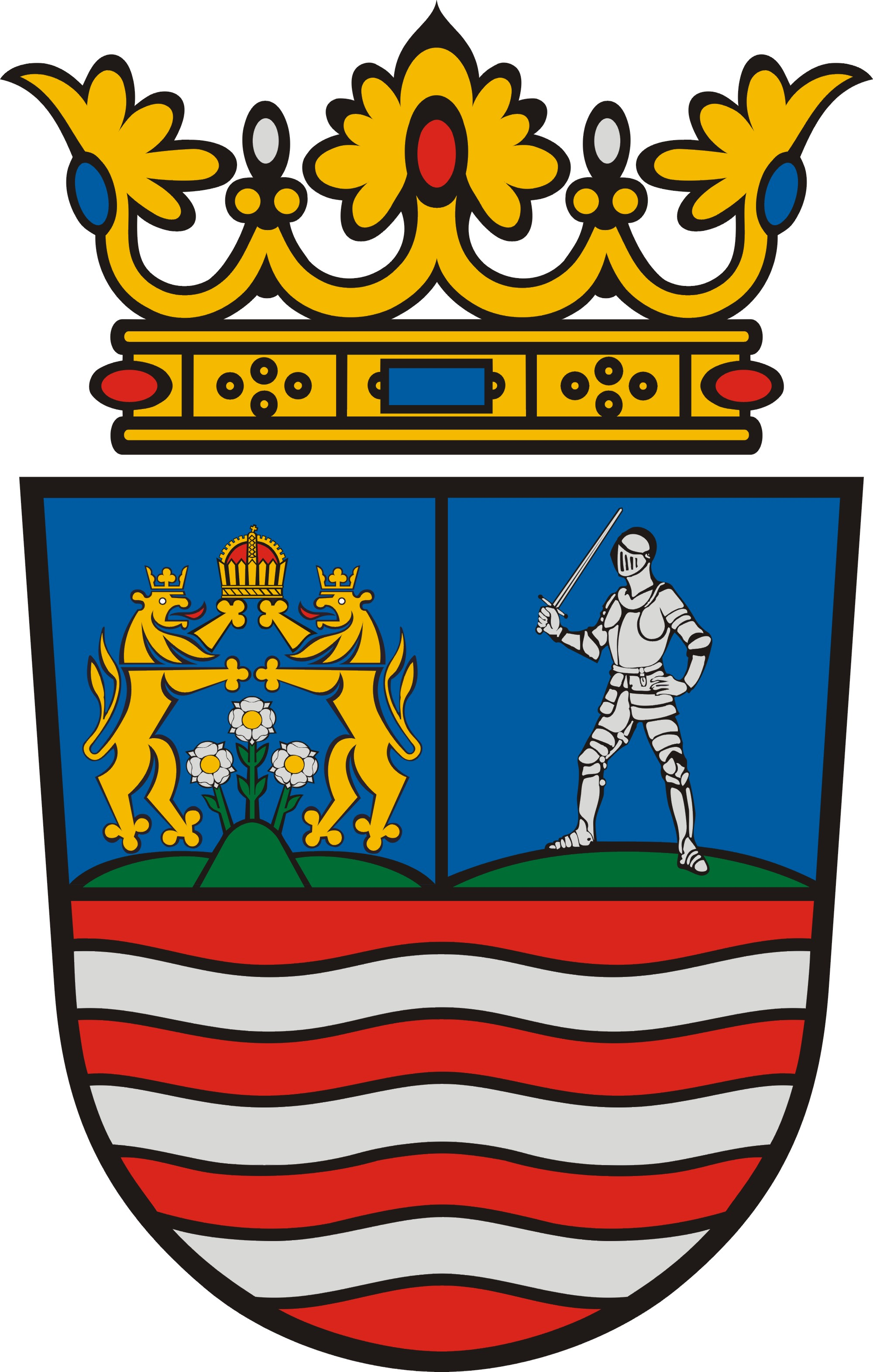
Győr-Moson-Sopron County

Bakonytamási

Dömös

Tihany

Tata

Zirc

Ráckeve
