= Flags of Hungarian history =

The Flags of Hungarian history (Hungarian: Magyar történelmi zászlósor) are a series of 23 flags selected from Hungarian history, spanning over 1100 years. Hungary uses them in official ceremonies.

== The flags in chronological order ==
1. Flag of the Grand Prince from the time of the Hungarian conquest of the Carpathian Basin (895)
2. Flag of King Saint Stephen of Hungary
3. Flag of the Árpád dynasty: the Árpád stripes
4. Flag of the Árpádian kings from the late 12th century: the double cross on three hills
5. Flag of the Anjou kings of Hungary
6. Flag of János Hunyadi, regent of Hungary
7. Flag of the Black Army of king Matthias Corvinus
8. Flag of Miklós Zrínyi
9. Flag of the nobility uprising of Nyitra County from the time of the Ottoman wars
10. Flag of the Hajdús of István Bocskai
11. Flag of Gábor Bethlen, Prince of Transylvania
12. Flag of Imre Thököly, Prince of Transylvania
13. Flag of Francis II Rákóczi, Prince of Hungary and Transylvania
14. Flag of the cavalry of Francis II Rákóczi
15. Flag of the hussars of Baranya from the 18th century
16. Flag of the Jassic-Cuman hussars from the 1770s
17. Flag of the uprising nobility of Pest County from the time of the Napoleonic Wars
18. Flag of the Honvéd Army in the closing months of the Hungarian Revolution of 1848
19. Flag of the Royal Hungarian Landwehr from 1869
20. Flag of the Royal Hungarian Army from 1938
21. Flag of the Hungarian Defence Forces from 1949
22. Flag of the Hungarian Revolution of 1956
23. Flag of the Hungarian Defence Forces from 1990

== Gallery ==
1. Princely standard from the Hungarian conquest era

2. Flag of Saint Stephen of Hungary

3. Flag of the Árpád dynasty

4. Flag of the Árpádian kings of Hungary

5. Flag of the Anjou kings of Hungary

6. Flag of János Hunyadi, regent of Hungary

7. Flag of the Black Army

11. Flag of Gábor Bethlen, Prince of Transylvania

13. Flag of Francis II Rákóczi

19. Colour of the Royal Hungarian Landwehr (1869)

20. Cavalry standard of the Royal Hungarian Army (1938)

21. Infantry standard of the Hungarian Defence Forces (1949)

22. Flag of the Hungarian Revolution of 1956

23. Unit colour of the Hungarian Defence Forces (1990)
