= Coat of arms of Hungary =

Versions
- Achievements, which may also be used in other historical forms.

- The official Hungarian state flag does not include the Hungarian coat of arms, but the variant with the coat of arms is often used during solemn occasions.
- Armiger: Hungary (lesser coat of arms); András Baka, President of Hungary (greater coat of arms with two angels); Péter Magyar, Prime Minister of Hungary (greater coat of arms with branches)
- Adopted: 11 July 1990
- Crest: Holy Crown of Hungary
- Shield: Barry of eight Gules and Argent, impaling Gules, on a trimount Vert a ducal coronet Or issuing therefrom a Patriarchal cross Argent

The coat of arms of Hungary (Hungarian: Magyarország címere) was adopted on 11 July 1990, after the end of communist rule. The arms have been used before, both with and without the Holy Crown of Hungary, sometimes as part of a larger, more complex coat of arms, and its elements date back to the Middle Ages.

The coat of arms of Hungary shall be a vertically divided shield with a pointed base. The left field shall contain eight horizontal bars of red and silver. The right field shall have a red background and shall depict a base of three green hills with a golden crown atop the central hill and a silver patriarchal cross issuing from the middle of the crown. The Holy Crown shall rest on top of the shield.

— Fundamental Law of Hungary – Foundation: Article I (1)

The shield is split into two parts:

- The dexter (the right side from the bearer's perspective, the left side from the viewer's) features the so-called Árpád stripes, four Gules (red) and four Argent (silver) stripes. Traditionally, the silver stripes represent four rivers: Duna (Danube), Tisza, Dráva, and Száva.
- The sinister (the left side from the bearer's perspective, the right side from the viewer's) consists of an Argent (silver) double cross on Gules (red) base, situated inside a small Or (golden) crown, the crown is placed on the middle heap of three Vert (green) hills, representing the mountain ranges (trimount) Tátra, Mátra, and Fátra.

Atop the shield rests the Holy Crown of Hungary, the crown of King Saint Stephen of Hungary. The crown is kept in the Hungarian Parliament Building in Budapest today.

== History ==
=== Grand Principality of Hungary (895–1000) ===
According to medieval Hungarian chronicles, King Attila had the Turul bird on his shield and it was the military badge of the Hungarians until the time of Grand Prince Géza. Under the rule of his son, King Saint Stephen, the Christian Kingdom of Hungary was established in 1000.

The griffin, wolf, and deer, these common motifs of the 9th and early 10th centuries, rarely appear in later Hungarian iconography and heraldic symbolism. However the hawk or Turul, a symbol in shamanistic lore that rested upon the tree of life, connecting the earth, the netherworld, and the skies, endured for a longer period as an emblem of the Hungarian ruling house. The ruling Árpád dynasty is also referred to as the Turul dynasty.

King Attila's banner bore the image of the bird the Hungarians call Turul, with a crown on its head, and this emblem he carried on his own shield. In fact, until the time of Duke Géza this flag was always carried with the Hunnish army, as long as they had a communal style government.

— Simon of Kéza: Gesta Hunnorum et Hungarorum

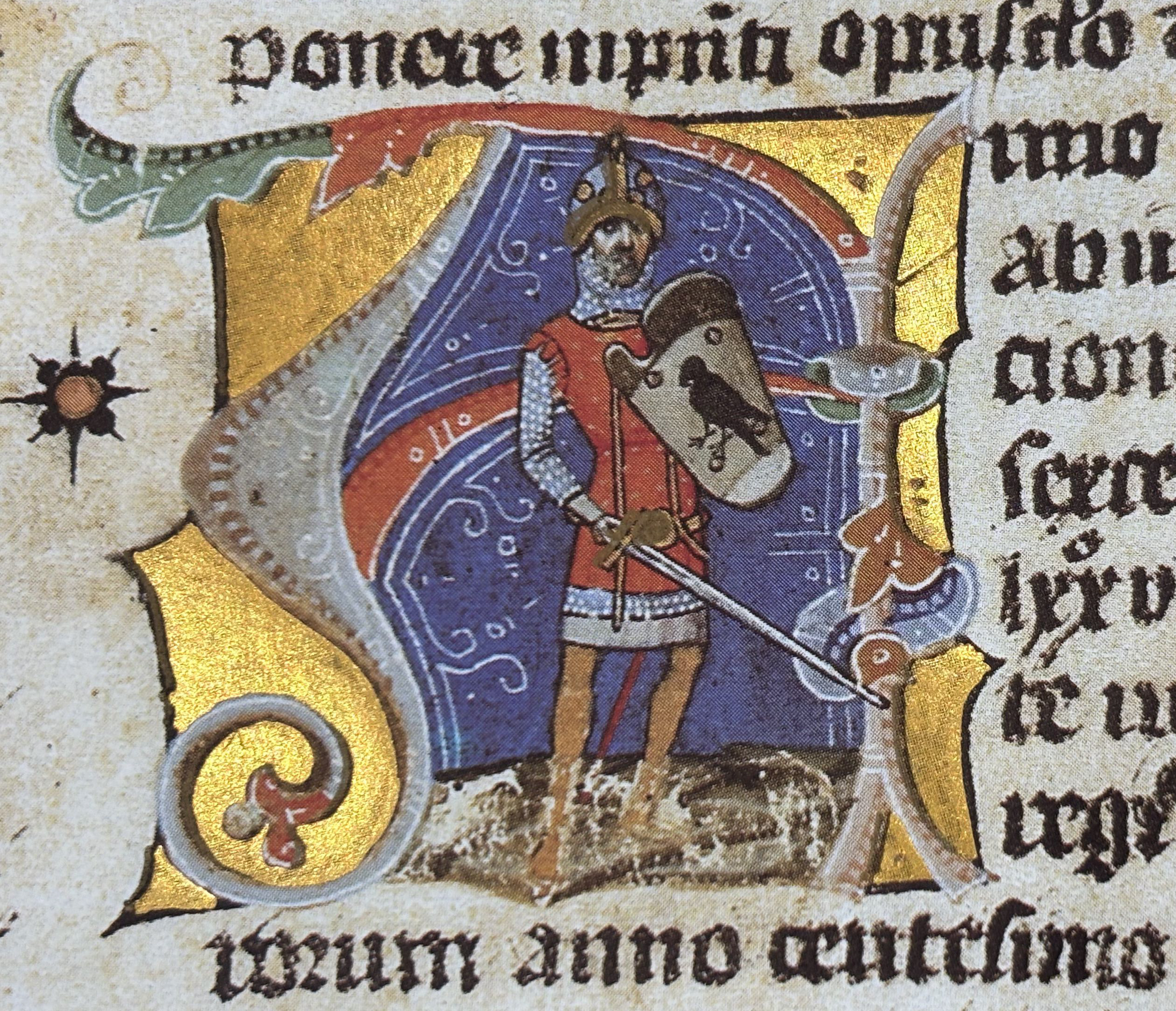
Grand Prince Álmos holding a shield bearing the Turul (Illuminated Chronicle, 1358)

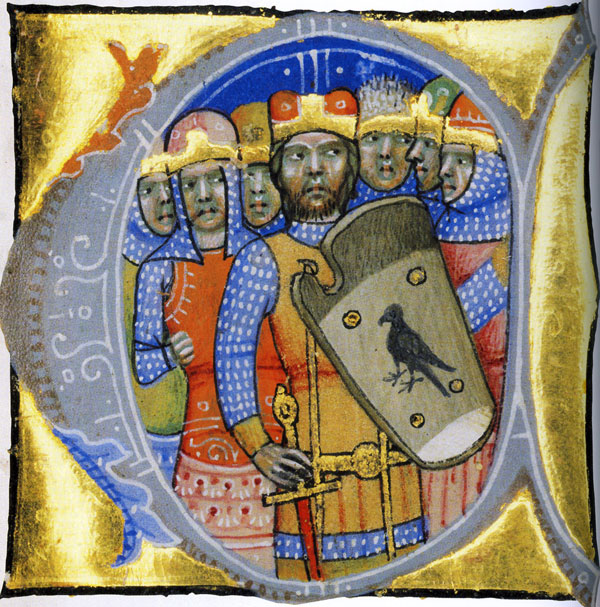
The Seven Chieftains of the Hungarians. Grand Prince Árpád stands in the center, holding a shield bearing the Turul. (Illuminated Chronicle, 1358)

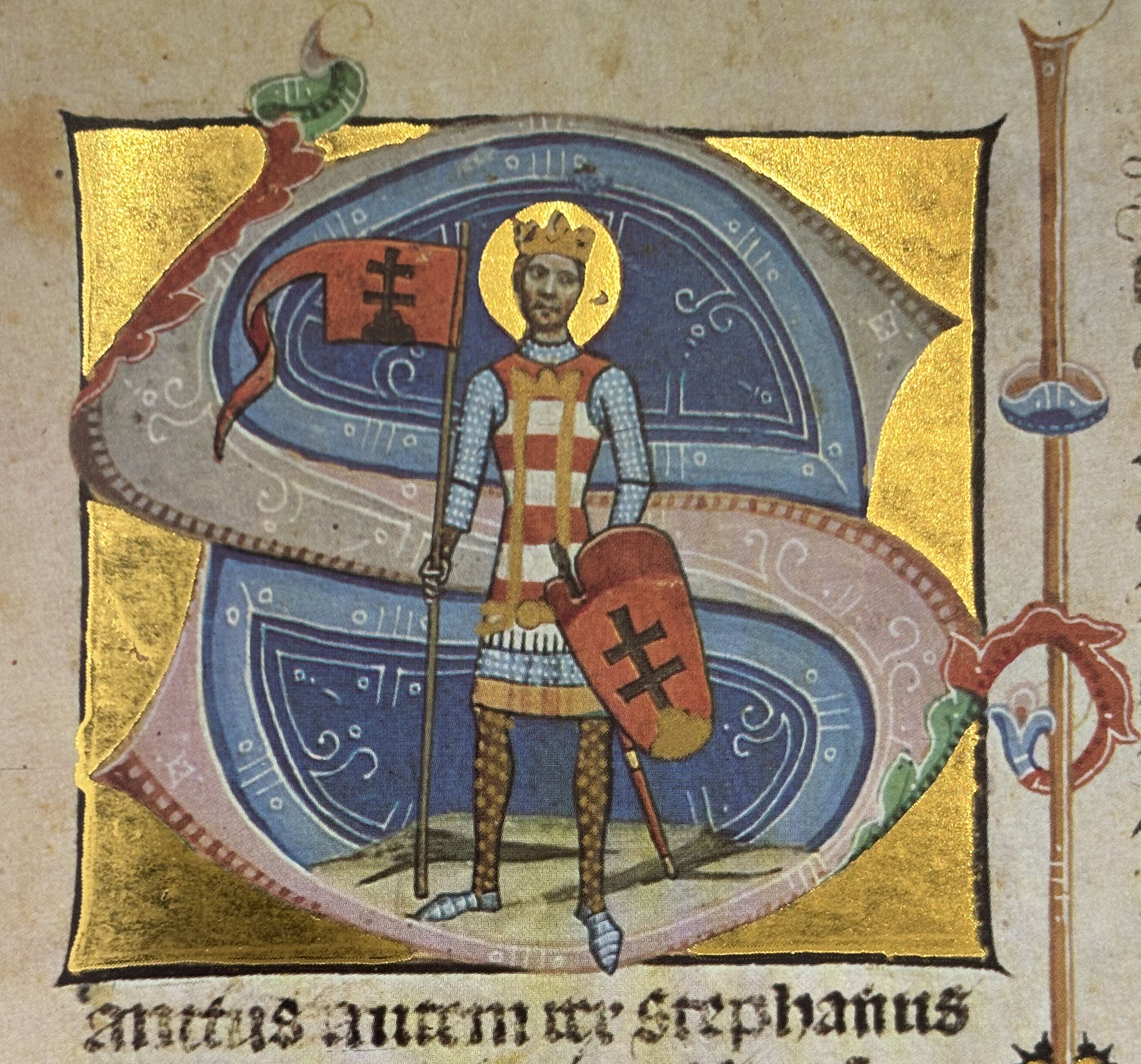
King Saint Stephen of Hungary holds a Hungarian flag and a shield, both bearing the double cross (Illuminated Chronicle, 1358)

=== Kingdom of Hungary (1000–1946) ===
The double cross, a symbol of royal power, appeared during the reign of King Béla III of Hungary (1172–1196). Daughter of King Saint Ladislaus I of Hungary, Saint Irene was a Byzantine empress, she was the mother of the Byzantine Emperor Manuel I Komnenos. The second son of King Géza II of Hungary, Béla arrived in Constantinople in 1163. Béla was raised in the imperial court of Manuel due to the close Byzantine–Hungarian relations of the mid-12th century, and he was even the heir to the throne. He had ambitions to create a Hungarian–Byzantine personal union. In 1169, Manuel's young wife gave birth to a son, thus depriving Béla of his status as heir of the Byzantine throne. The most intensive contacts between the Hungarian royal court and the Constantinople imperial court was under Béla III. It was during this time that he brought with him the double cross as a royal emblem, which appeared for the first time on his coat of arms and minted coins.

King Emeric (1196–1204) issued a Golden Bull. The Árpád dynasty's striped coat of arms, the Árpád stripes appeared for the first time on the ornate seal of the king, issued in 1202. The royal charters issued by monarchs were authenticated by seals and bulls, making them the most important sources for the medieval history of Hungarian coats of arms. The first colored depiction of the striped Árpád coat of arms can be seen in the Zurich armorial scroll from the 1320s. The Árpád coat of arms was only in use for a short period during the 13th century. On the coins and seals of King Béla IV of Hungary (1235–1270), the double-cross shield reappears.

After the extinction of the male branch of the Árpád dynasty in 1301, the Hungarian Anjou kings (King Charles I of Hungary (1308–1342), King Louis I of Hungary (1342–1382)) combined the Árpád dynasty's striped shield with their own lily coat of arms. At this time, the placement of the stripes was not yet fixed and could appear on either side of the coat of arms. By using the striped shield, the Anjous indicated their connection to the Árpád dynasty through a female line. On the reverse side of their seal, they engraved the double cross, which symbolized the country.

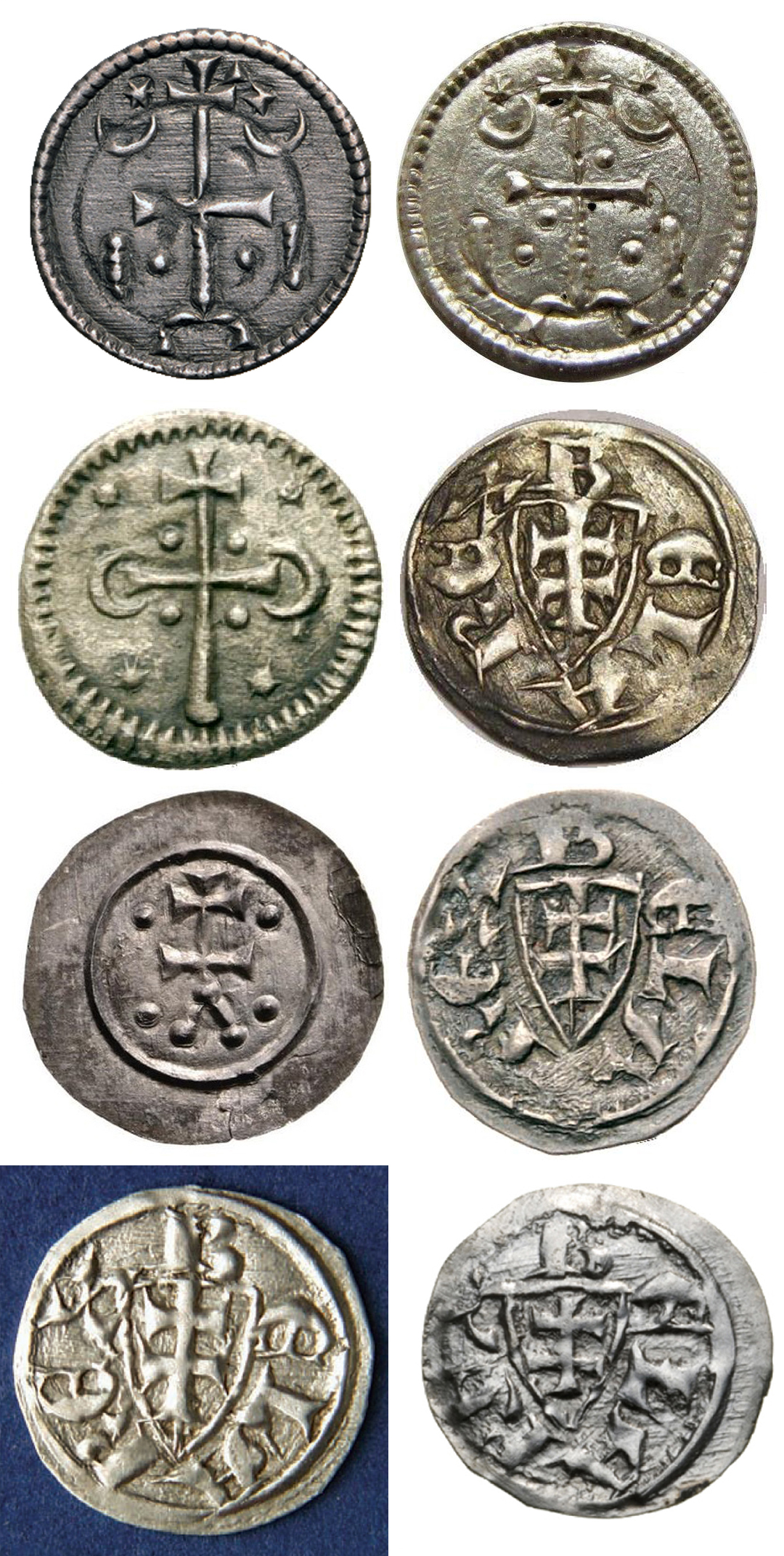
Coins of King Béla III of Hungary (1172–1196) with double crosses

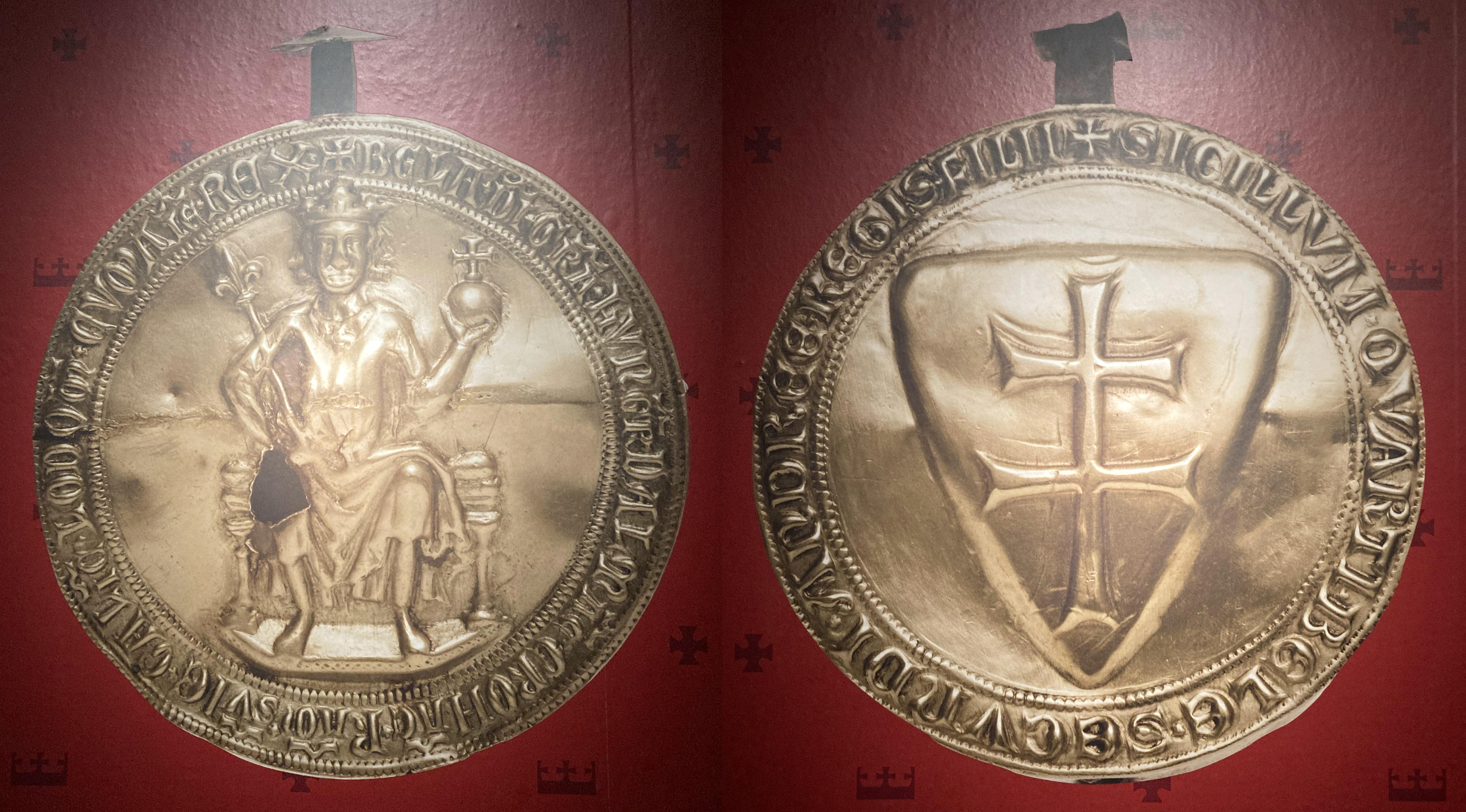
The seal of King Béla IV of Hungary (1235–1270) from his Golden Bull

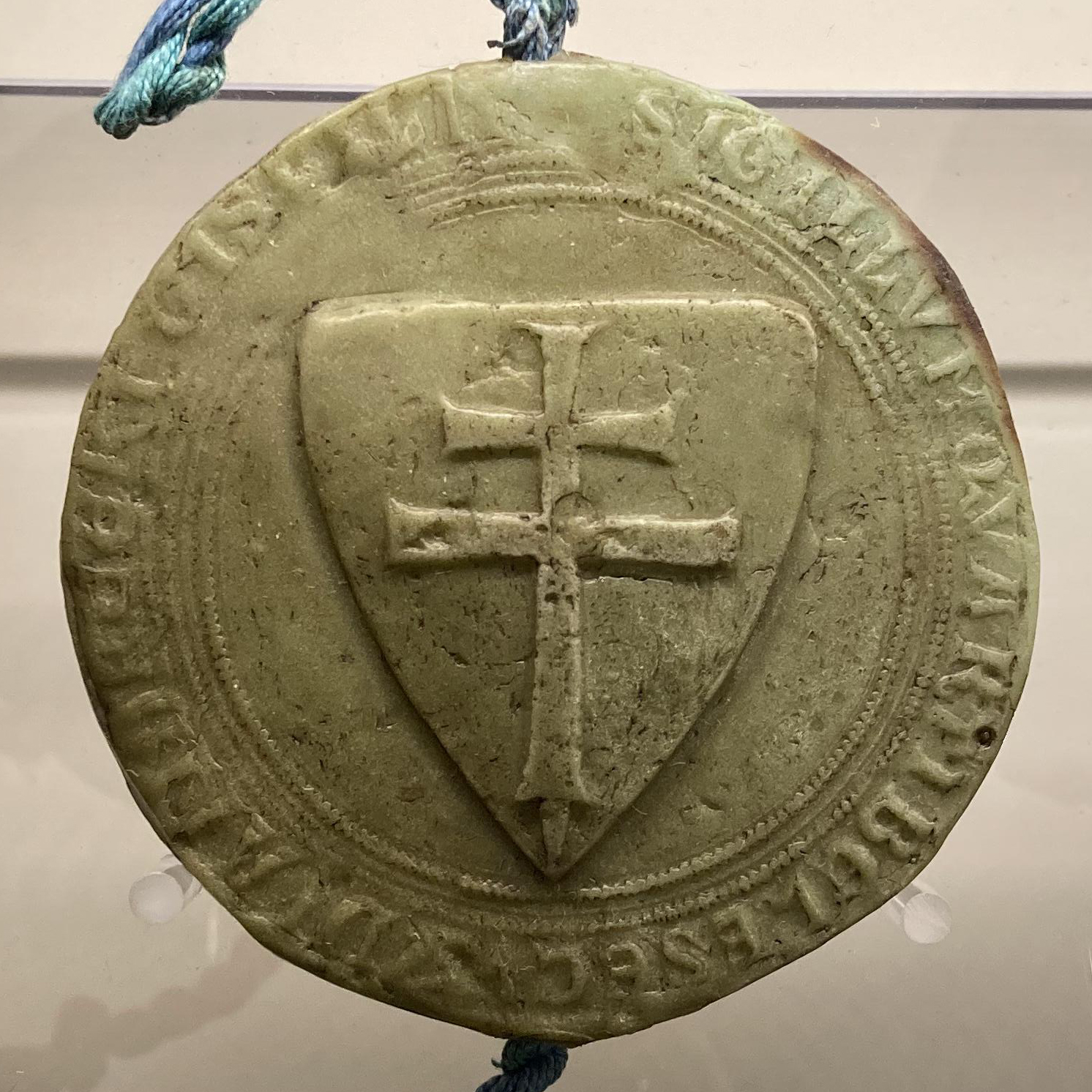
Reverse of the first double seal (1235–1241) of King Béla IV of Hungary (1235–1270)

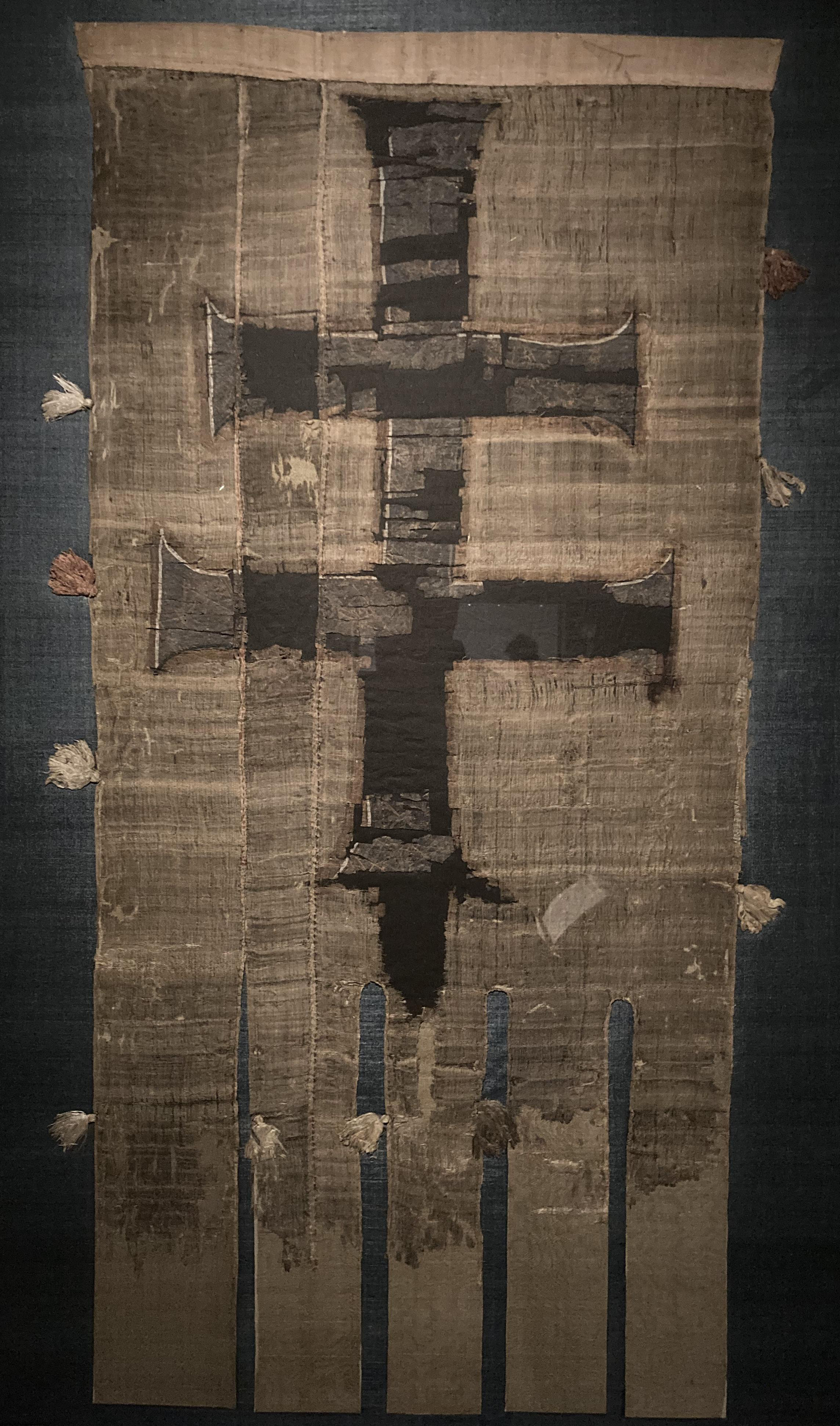
Hungarian flag from Königsfelden Monastery from the first half of the 14th century, from the monastery of Agnes of Habsburg, widow of King Andrew III of Hungary (1290–1301)

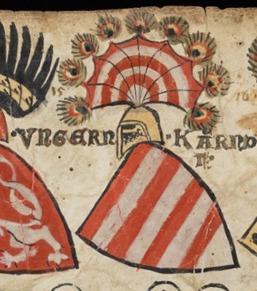
Zurich armorial scroll - The Hungarian royal Árpád dynasty's striped coat of arms from around 1340

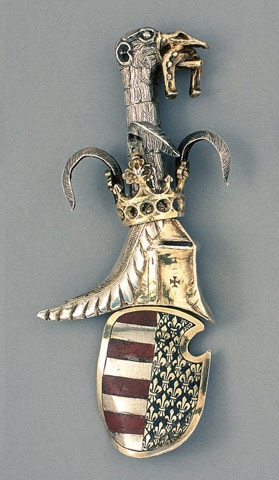
Hungarian coat of arms with Angevin helmet (1340s)

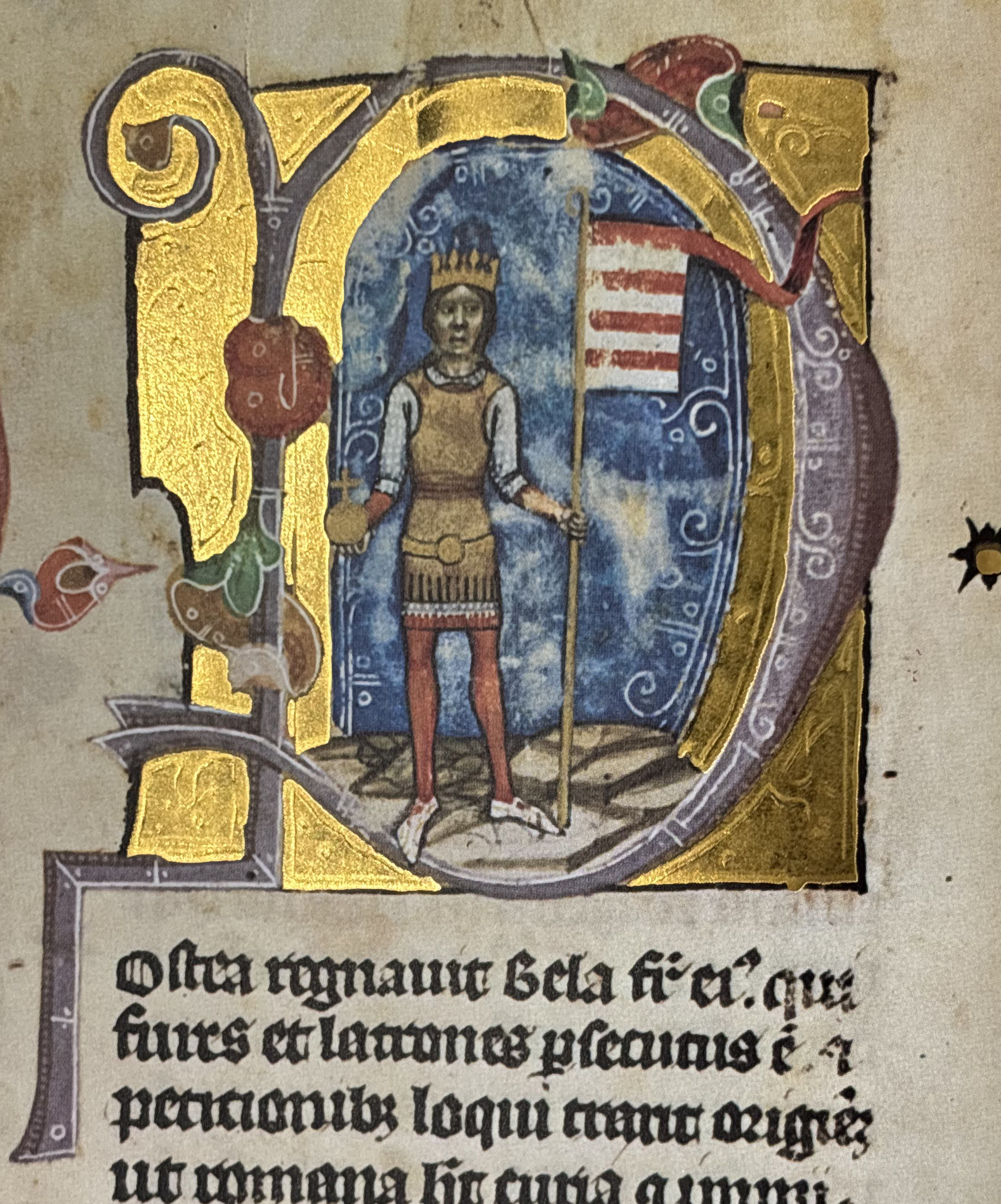
King Béla III of Hungary holds a red-and-white striped flag bearing the Árpád stripes (Illuminated Chronicle, 1358)

The Hungarian Angevin coat of arms and the Hungarian double-cross coat of arms (Illuminated Chronicle, 1358)

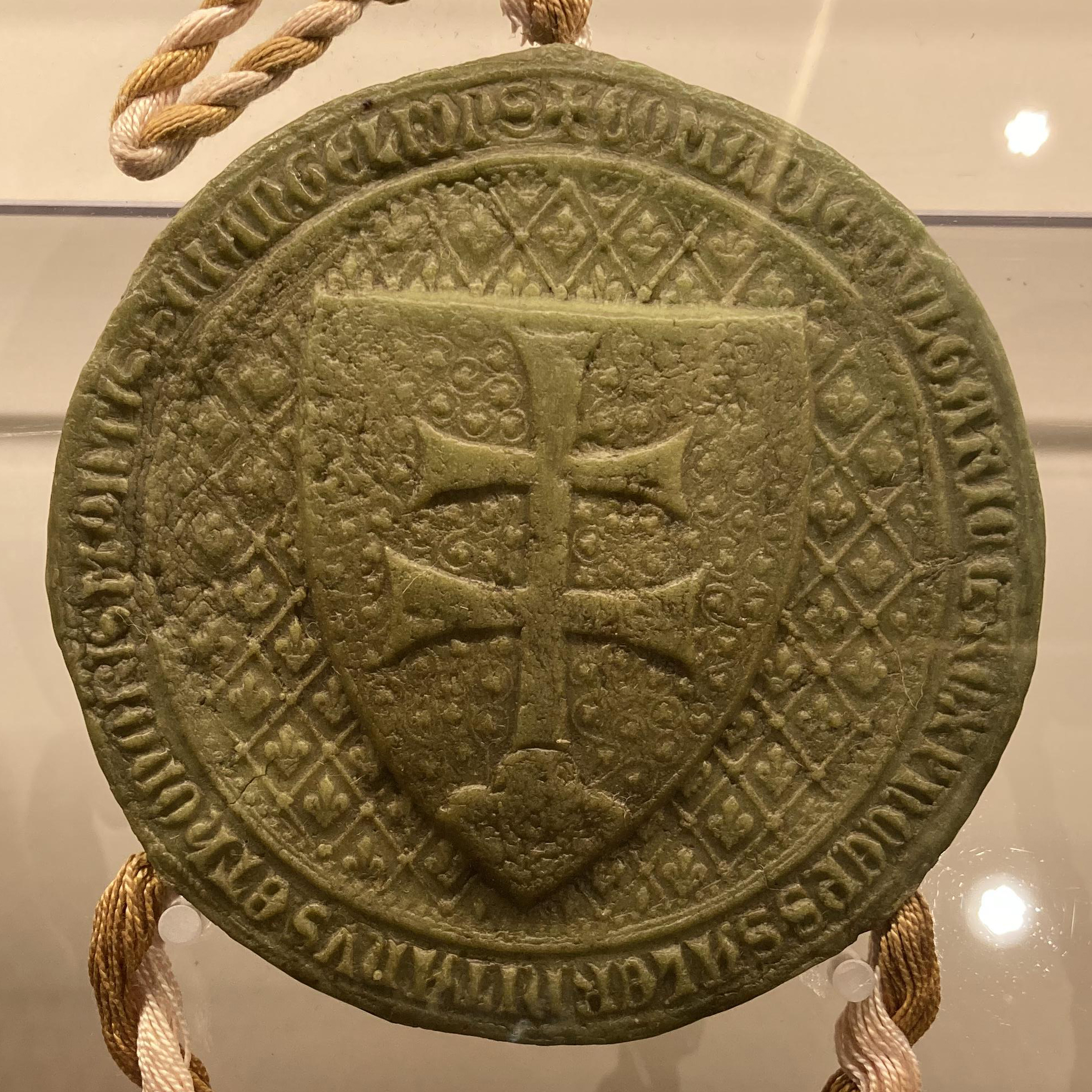
Reverse of the second double seal (1366–1382) of King Louis I the Great (1342–1382). This was later become the predecessor to the modern coat of arms of Slovakia.

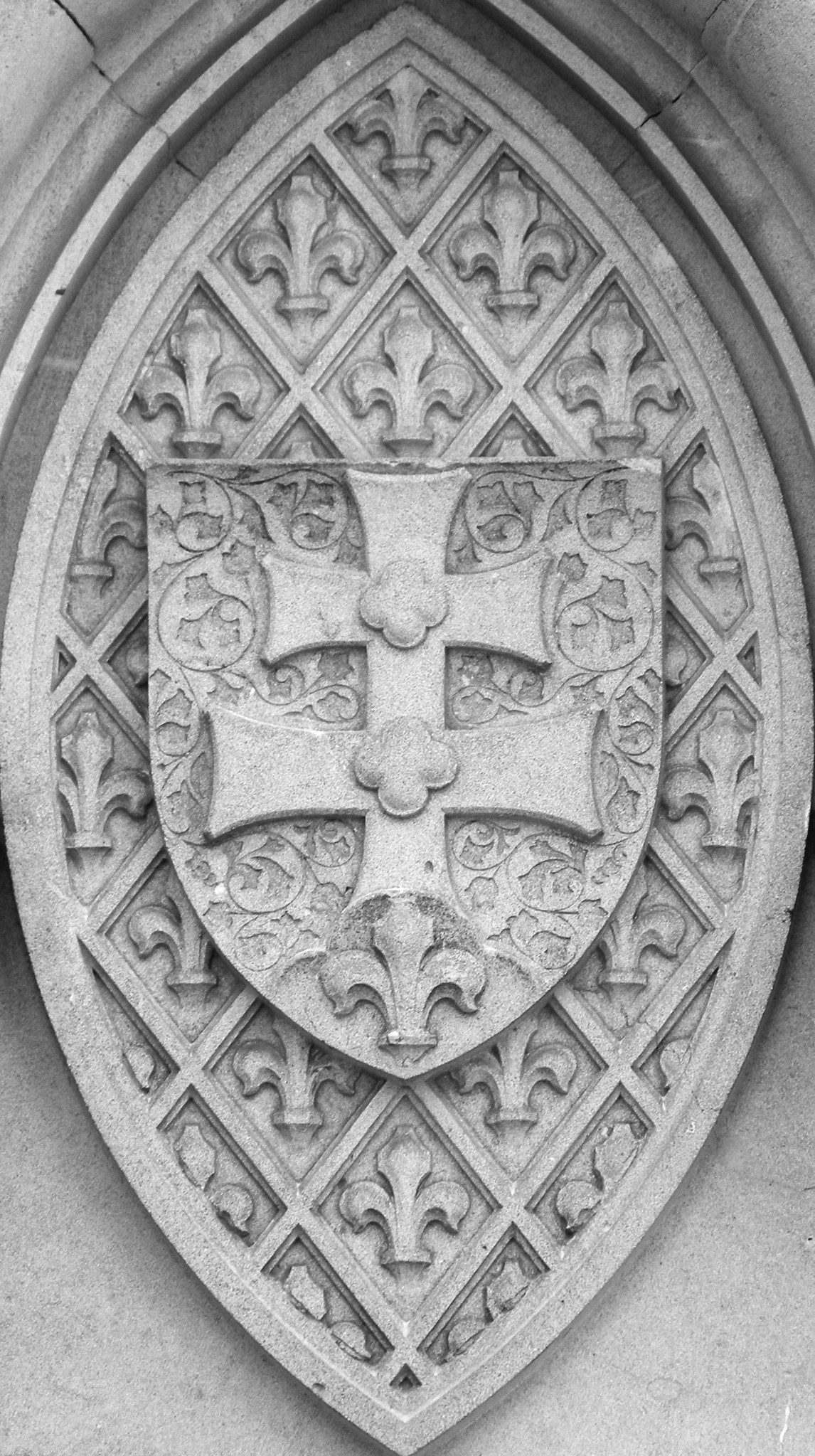
Coat of arms of King Louis I the Great (1364). Wall relief on the courtyard of Bojnice Castle.

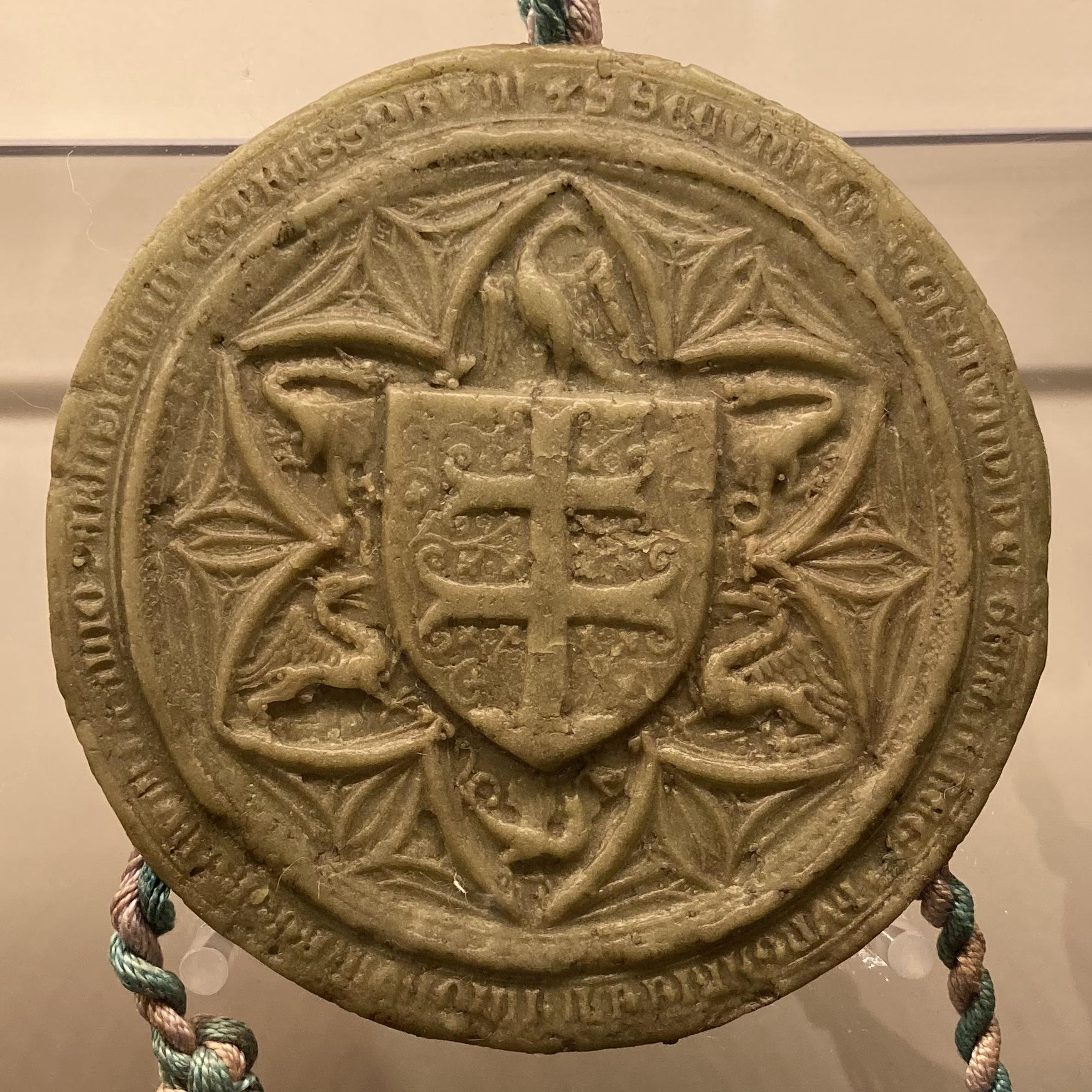
Reverse of the first double seal (1387–1405) of King Sigismund of Luxembourg (1387–1437)

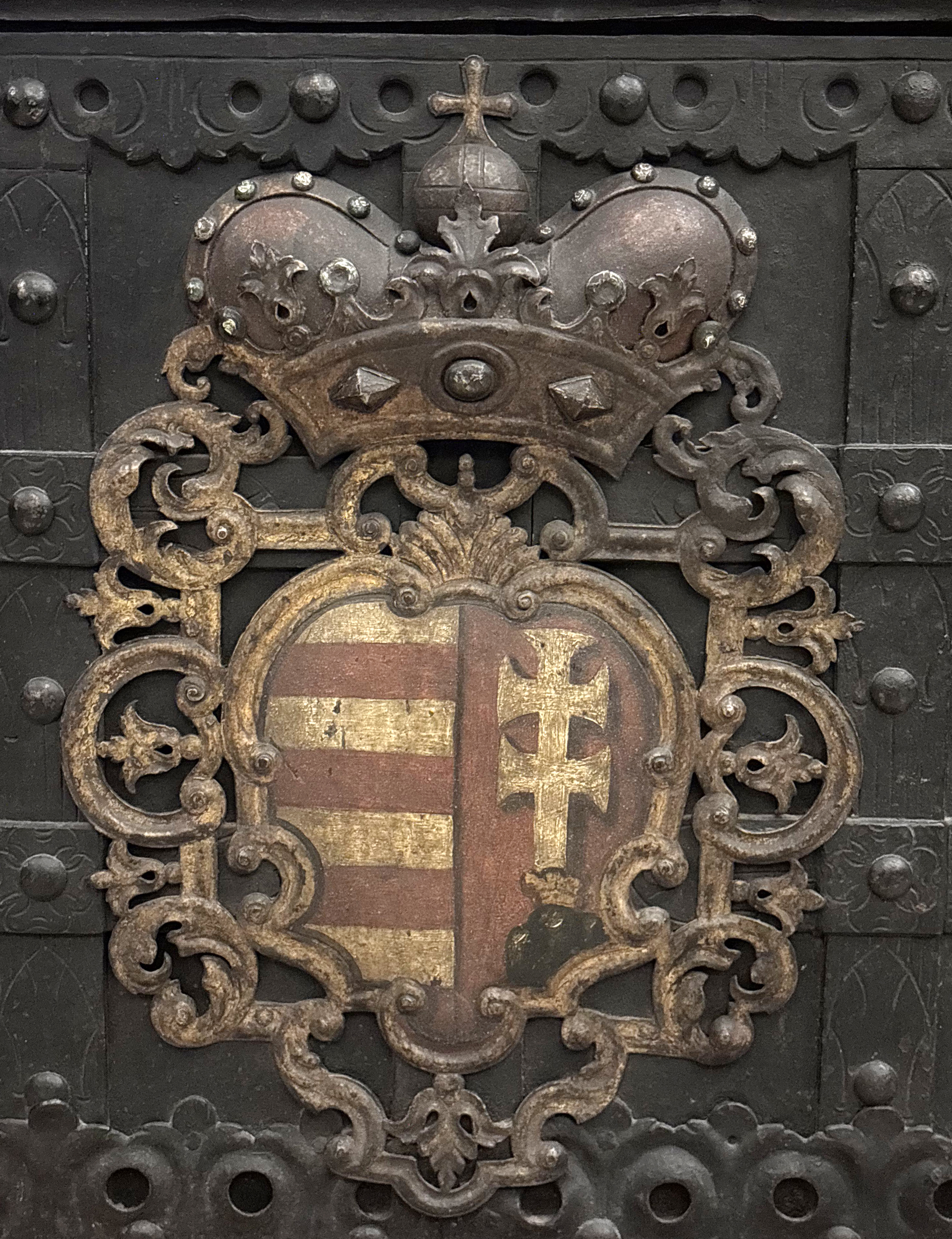
Hungarian military cash chest bearing the national coat of arms (c.1700)

The double cross symbol found its way to Western Europe through Hungary, because René the Good, who was related to the House Anjou of Hungary, laid claim to four kingdoms, including Hungary. He placed the symbol on his flags before the Battle of Nancy, Lorraine in 1477. He won the battle and regained his lost Duchy of Lorraine. Thus the symbol became known in Western Europe as the Cross of Lorraine.

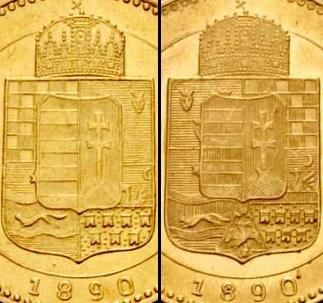
Arms of Hungary on the 1890 Austro-Hungarian florin coin; the right version adds the arms of Fiume

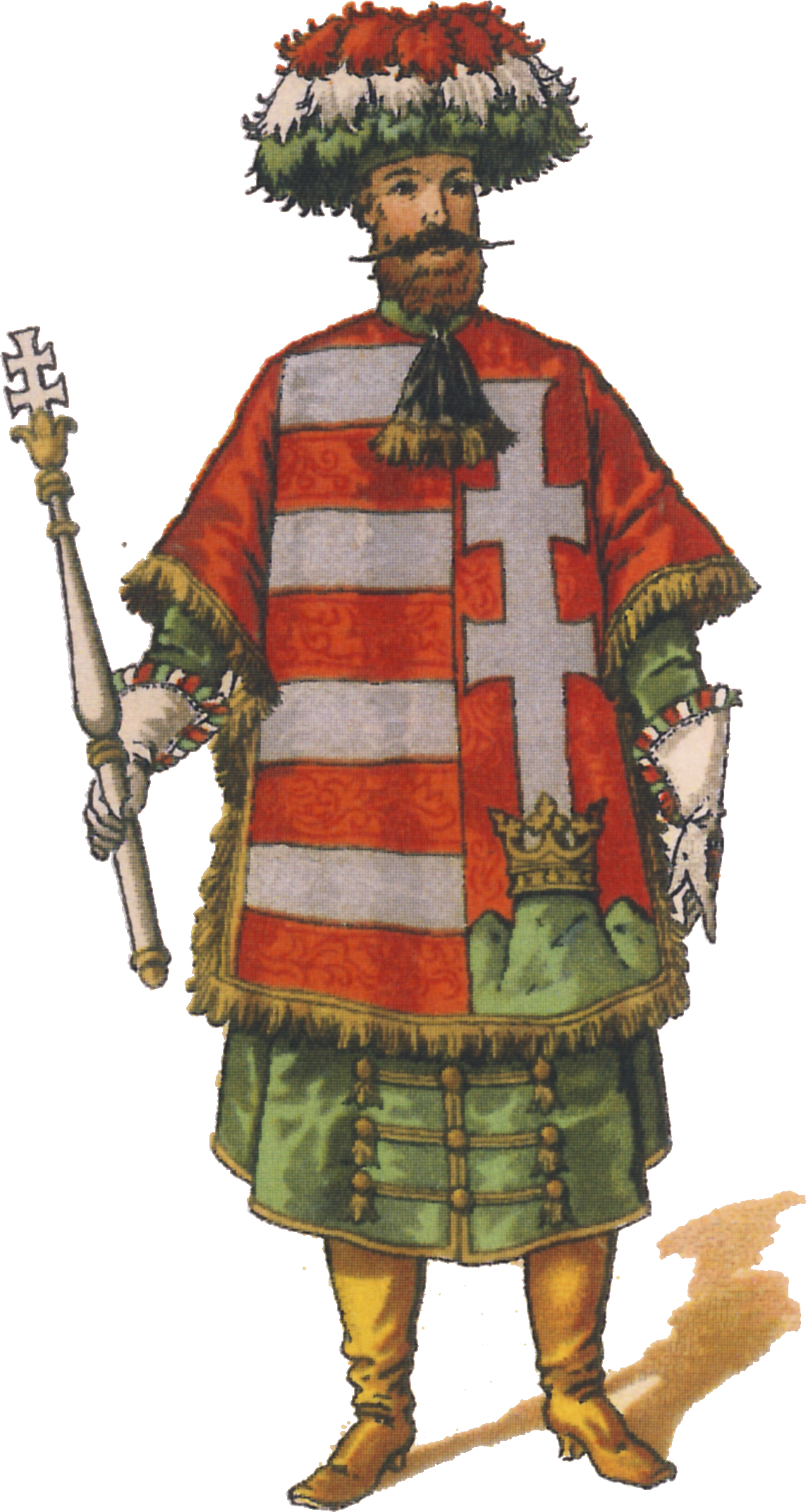
Royal herald wearing tabard with the arms of Hungary in the 1899 book Heraldischer Atlas

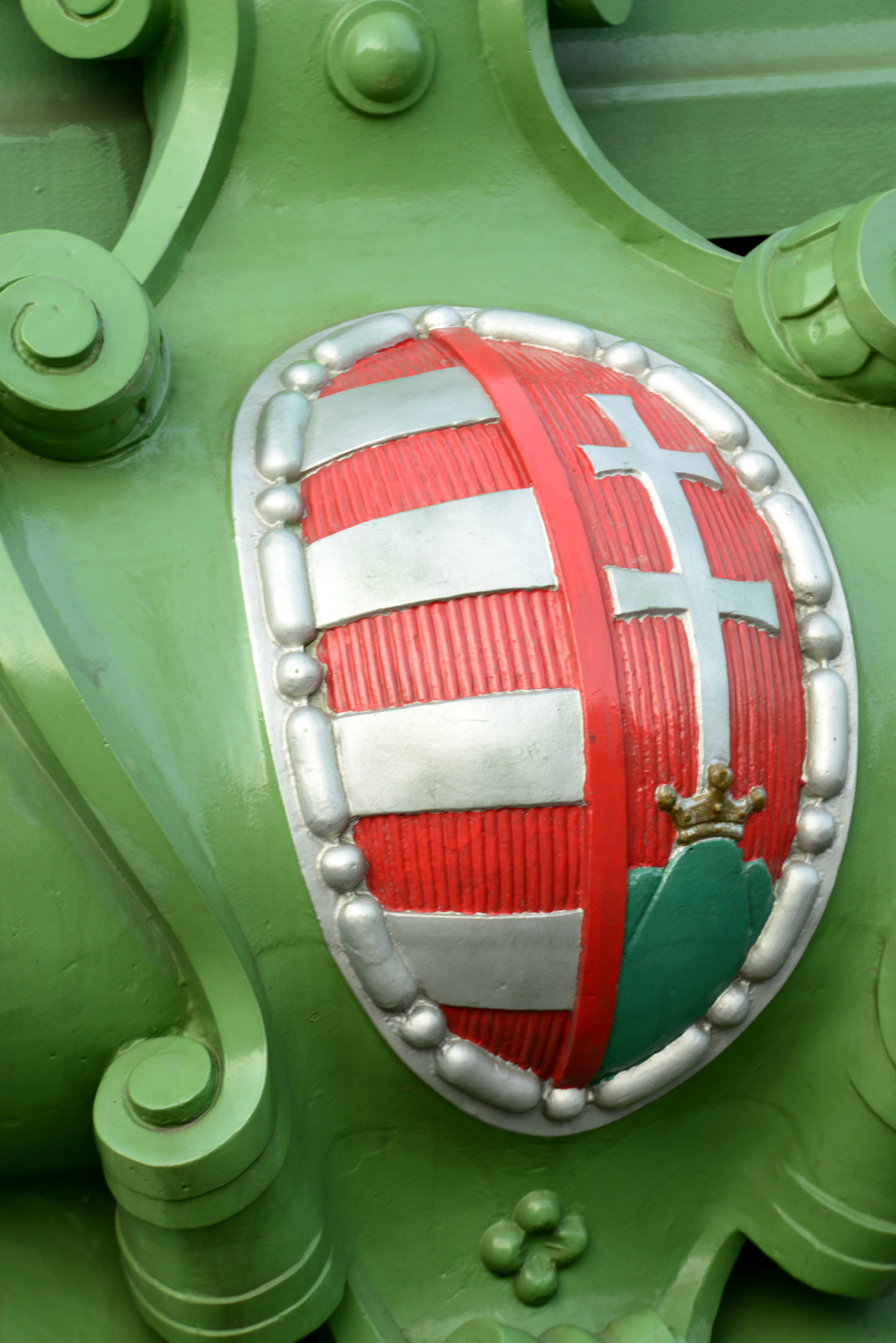
Coat of Arms at Liberty Bridge in Budapest

== List of Hungarian coat of arms ==
The double cross, a symbol of royal power, appeared during the reign of King Béla III of Hungary (1172–1196).
The red and white stripes were the heraldic symbol of the House of Árpád, first appeared in 1202, in the coat of arms of King Emeric's (r. 1196–1204) seal. This was the coat of arms of Emeric used on his 1202 golden bull. It shows nine lions.
On the Golden Bull of 1222, issued by Andrew II (r. 1205–1235), the stripes contain seven lions. The lion is a widespread symbol of royal power.
The coat of arms of Stephen V (r. 1270–1272) was a red triangle curved on all sides bordered by silver and black lines. At the bottom there's a green trimount on a red field, from which a silver double-cross erects. On the lower part of it, there is a green wreath.
Coat of arms of King Ladislaus IV of Hungary (1272–1290)
Andrew III (r. 1290–1301) used a red triangle-shaped shield with a curved side and a silver and black frame as his coat of arms. In the middle it contained the usual double-cross in silver color, but with a green wreath around the lower part and a pointed bottom. At the top on the left side it features a silver crescent, while on the left side, a silver six-pointed star.
The seal of Wenceslaus III (r. 1301–1305) shows the simple double cross with green trimount. After the extinction of the male branch of the Árpád dynasty in 1301, the claimants to the throne from the female branch of the dynasty used the double cross to signify their claim to the Hungarian royal title.
When the House of Árpád became extinct and the Angevins came into power, they wanted to emphasize their legitimacy and their matrilineal relation to the previous royal house by using the Árpáds' coat of arms, the red and white stripes. Charles I combined this coat of arms per pale with the Angevins' fleur-de-lis.
King Louis I
Great coat of arms of King Matthias. In the middle are personal coat of arms of Matthias Corvinus (Quartered: 1. Hungary's two-barred cross, 2. Árpád dynasty, 3. Bohemia, and 4. Hunyadi family) and that of his wife Beatrice of Naples (Quartered: 1. and 4. Árpád dynasty – France ancient – Jerusalem Impaled; 2. and 3. Aragon), above them a royal crown. On the outer edge there are coat of arms of various lands, beginning from the top clockwise they are: Bohemia, Luxemburg, Lower Lusatia, Moravia, Austria, Galicia–Volhynia, Silesia, Dalmatia-Croatia, Beszterce county.
Louis I of Hungary quartered the red and white stripes of the Árpáds with the double cross on the trimount. This design was also used by John Zápolya, with his family arms in an inescutcheon.
The two coats of arms are often shown side by side in the 15th century. Their combination per pale, with the stripes on the dexter side and the cross with trimount on the sinister first appeared on coins during the reign of Vladislaus I (r. 1440–1444), and later on coins of Matthias Corvinus (r. 1458–1490). The crown above the coat of arms also appeared during the reign of Vladislaus I. At first it was only a non-specific diadem but on the 1464 seal of Matthias Corvinus it resembled more the Holy Crown of Hungary. The modern version of the coat of arms developed during the reign of Matthias II in the beginning of the 17th century. Its usage became regular during the reign of Maria Theresa.
During the Hungarian Revolution of 1848, following the dethroning of the Habsburg dynasty on 14 April 1849, the Holy Crown was removed from the coat of arms. The remaining small coat of arms is usually referred to as the "Kossuth Coat of Arms" (Hungarian: Kossuth-címer) after Lajos Kossuth, Regent-President of Hungary (so unlike the name suggests, it was not the coat of arms of the Kossuth family). In the large coat of arms, however, a laurel wreath replaced the crown both in the central piece and above the shield, as shown on the adjacent image.
In the following centuries, the coat of arms of Hungary became more and more complex. It included the coats of arms of the territories which were part of the Lands of the Crown of Saint Stephen: Croatia, Dalmatia, Slavonia, and Bosnia, but the so-called "small coat of arms" always remained the central piece. (The more complex ones were called "medium" and "large coat of arms".) The adjacent image shows the medium coat of arms, in official use (with some modifications) from the Austro-Hungarian Compromise of 1867 till the end of World War I (1918). The outer pieces (anti-clockwise from top left) are the coats of arms of Dalmatia, Slavonia, Bosnia (added in 1915), Fiume, Transylvania, and Croatia. When Hungary became part of the Habsburg monarchy, the coat of arms became a part of that of the Monarchy, but later it became of marginal importance and during the reign of Joseph II – who did not even have himself crowned with the Holy Crown – it was omitted from the coins.
Used from 1915 to 1918. After the revolution was repressed, the Hungarian coat of arms was not used again until the Austro-Hungarian Compromise of 1867, when the small coat of arms with the crown once more became a part of a more complex coat of arms, similar to the medium coat of arms shown above. The Hungarian arms also became part of the combined coat of arms of Austria-Hungary.

=== Changes during the 20th century ===
After World War I, during the time of the First Hungarian Republic a new coat of arms was introduced. The new arms was almost the same as the "small coat of arms" only with the monarchist elements removed to make it look more republican.
The Hungarian Republic of Councils in 1919 totally abolished the traditional coat of arms and used the communist five-pointed red star on official documents. After the fall of the communists, the Kossuth coat of arms was used for a short while.
After the restoration of the kingdom, the small coat of arms (with the Holy Crown and the two angels) became official until the First Vienna Award in 1938, when the government started to use the 1915 coat of arms officially again.
During the occupation of Hungary by Nazi Germany in 1944–1945 at the end of World War II, the puppet government formed by the fascist Arrow Cross Party added the letter "H" (for Hungaria) and the Arrow Cross symbol to it.
Following the military forces of Nazi Germany in Hungary being defeated by the Red Army, Soviet military occupation ensued, eventually leading to the creation of a communist government in Hungary. Between 1946 and 1949 the Kossuth-style coat of arms was used, then the Hungarian People's Republic introduced a new state coat of arms in line with socialist heraldry, with a layout closely resembling that of the Soviet Union's.
During the 1956 revolution, the "Kossuth" Coat of Arms was used again. In old newsreels, the Kossuth badge can be seen painted onto the turrets of many revolutionary tanks fighting against the Soviet invasion in the streets of Budapest. Although this revolution was crushed quickly by the Soviet Army, the new Communist government did not reinstate the 1949–1956 coat of arms, and thus this coat of arms was used for about a year.
A new coat of arms was created in late 1957, incorporating a more traditional heraldic escutcheon (bearing the Hungarian red-white-green tricolor) into the wreath-and-red-star framework of socialist heraldry. Its usage ended with the adoption of the current coat of arms in 1990.
Since 1990 the historical crowned small coat of arms has served as the official symbol of Hungary. In the first democratically elected Parliament there was considerable debate about the depiction of the Holy Crown on the coat of arms. The liberal, opposition party (Alliance of Free Democrats, SZDSZ) proposed the Kossuth-style "Republican" version but the conservative government backed the historical, crowned one.

=== Honours ===
- In May and June 1946 a set of eight stamps of Coat of arms of Hungary was issued. These are the issues of inflation.
- Further, a fourteen-stamp set of Arms and Post-horn were issued May and June 1946; these are also the issues of inflation.
- Four commemorative stamps were issued on 15 March 1948 as part of the series: Centenary of the beginning of Hungary's war for Independence.
- On 20 August 1949 three stamps of Arms of Hungary were issued on the occasion of the Adoption of the Hungarian Peoples' Republic's Constitution.
- On 23 May 1958 three stamps were issued to commemorate the first anniversary of the law amending the constitution.
- Between 1941 and 45 as many as 44 Postage-Due stamps of various denominations, watermarks and paper were issued.

Some other stamps were also issued.

== See also ==
- Coat of arms of Slovakia
- Coat of arms of Budapest
- Flag of Hungary
- Hungarian heraldry
- Patriarchal cross
- Cross of Lorraine

== Sources ==
- Bertényi, Iván (1983). Kis magyar címertan [A Short Hungarian Heraldry] (in Hungarian). Budapest: Gondolat Zsebkönyvek. ISSN 0133-0489.
- MKI (2022). Kings and Saints - The Age of the Árpáds (PDF). Budapest, Székesfehérvár: Institute of Hungarian Research. ISBN 978-615-6117-65-6.
- Monter, William (2007). A Bewitched Duchy: Lorraine and its Dukes, 1477-1736. Librairie Droz. ISBN 978-2-600-01165-5.
- Rady, Martyn (2000). Nobility, land and service in medieval Hungary. PALGRAVE, Houndmills, Basingstoke, Hampshire and New York. ISBN 0-333-71018-5.
