= Hungarian heraldry =

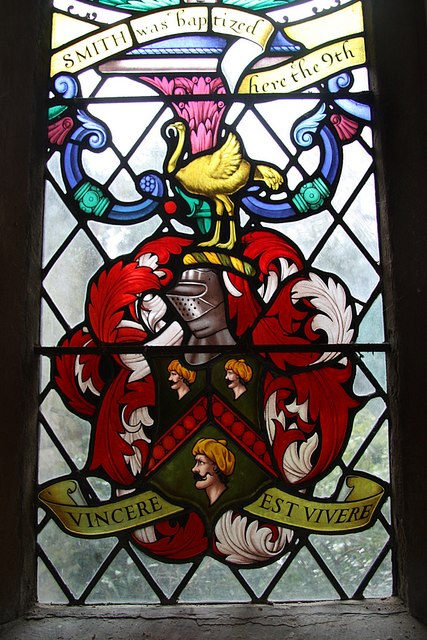
Coat of arms of John Smith (explorer) showing the heads of the three Turks killed by John Smith in duels

Hungarian heraldry generally follows German heraldry in its artistic forms, but has its own distinctive character. It is classified to Central and Eastern European heraldry.

== Private armory ==
One of the most common devices found on Hungarian shields is a symbol of the many Turkish invasions of Hungary: the head of a Turk with a black mustache wearing a turban, blood dripping from the neck. At least 15 percent of all Hungarian personal arms include the severed head of a Turk, Also popular were the griffin, bear, sun, moon, stars, horses, men on horseback, swords and a green dragon with a red cross on its body. A coronet often replaces the wreath above the helmet. The mantling is often a combination of more than two tinctures, the most common being blue and gold on the dexter side and red and silver on the sinister. Hungarian heraldry also employs a clan system instead of individual arms. The arms of the old kingdom of Hungary included St. Stephen's cross, lions' heads, eagles and a six-pointed star representing the old kingdoms and provinces of Bosnia, Croatia, Dalmatia, Herzegovina, Slavonia, and Transylvania.

Most Hungarian coats of arms are figurative; arms with simple divisions of the shield, or charged with ordinaries and subordinaries only, are extremely rare and mostly of foreign origin. The color of the field is most often blue, representing the sky. Around 90% of Hungarian arms have a green base, often a trimount.

In many cases mantling has more than two tinctures. The barred helm is normally used, but this is not a rule. There are few Hungarian arms without a crest coronet.

Due to great demand of soldiers during the wars against the Turks in the 16th and 17th centuries, sometimes a whole garrison of 80 to 120 soldiers was raised to nobiliary rank, being granted one coat of arms for all of them to share.

== Official armory ==
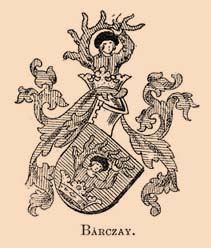
Coat of arms of the Bárczay Family

The double cross was an ancient element in the arms of Hungary. It may have been given to Saint Stephen by the pope as the symbol of the apostolic Kingdom of Hungary. Today, the most accepted theory is that it derives from Byzantine influence, as the cross appeared around 1190 during the reign of King Béla III, who was raised in the Byzantine court.

The red and white stripes were the symbol of the Árpáds, the dynasty of the first Hungarian kings (1000-1301), and they were first used in the coat of arms in 1202 on a seal of King Emeric.

The coat of arms with the stripes on the dexter half and the cross on the hills on the sinister half appeared during the reign of Louis I of Hungary (1342-1382). The crown above the coat of arms appeared during the reign of Vladislaus I of Hungary (1440-1444). At first it was only a non-specific diadem but on the 1464 seal of Matthias Corvinus it resembled more the Holy Crown of Hungary.

The three green hills represent the mountains Tátra, Mátra and Fátra (made up of the Veľká Fatra and Malá Fatra ranges).

Coat of arms of the Hungarian town Komádi

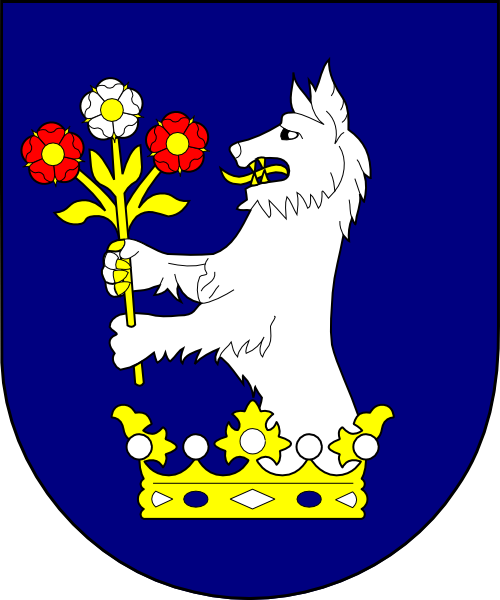
Coat of arms of Révay family

Modern coat of arms of Hungary (1990–present)

Coat of arms of Hungary under communist rule (1957-1990)

== Vocabulary ==
- coat of arms = címer
- crest = sisakdísz

Tincture	Heraldic name	Hungarian name
Metals - Fémek
Gold/Yellow	Or	arany
Silver/White	Argent	ezüst
Colours - Színek
Blue	Azure	kék
Red	Gules	piros
Purple	Purpure	bíbor
Black	Sable	fekete
Green	Vert	zöld

== See also ==
- Coat of arms of Hungary
- Historical coat of arms of Transylvania
- Nobility and royalty of the Kingdom of Hungary
