= Maximilian von Holnstein =

German nobleman

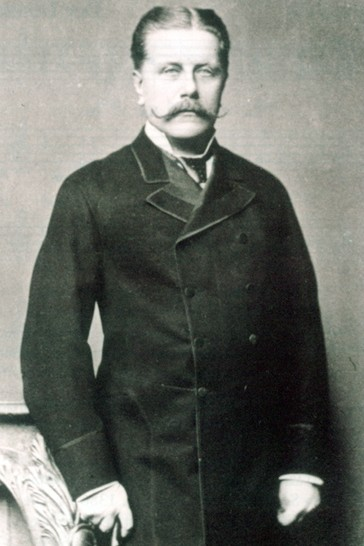

Maximilian Carl Theodor, Count von Holnstein aus Bayern (19 October 1835 – 1 February 1895) was a German nobleman who was a playmate of princes Ludwig and Otto (both later kings of Bavaria), and friend of Ludwig on his accession as Ludwig II. Count Maximilian brought Ludwig's "Kaiserbrief" to Otto von Bismarck.

== Early life ==
Holnstein was born on 19 October 1835 in Munich, Germany. He was the eldest surviving son of celebrated beauty Baroness Caroline Maximiliana Maria von Spiering (1815–1859) and her first husband, Carl Theodor, Count von Holnstein aus Bayern (1797–1857). After his father's death, his mother remarried to Wilhelm, Baron von Künsberg, and had a daughter, Baroness Wilhelmine Maria Caroline von Künsberg (wife of Friedrich von Breidbach-Bürresheim).

His maternal grandparents were Carl Theodor Baron von Spiering, lord of Schloss Fronberg, and his wife Johanna Nepumukena (née Baroness von Enzberg). His paternal grandparents were Maximilian Joseph, Count of Holnstein, married to Princess Maria Josepha of Hohenlohe-Waldenburg-Schillingsfürst (eldest daughter of Prince Charles Albert II). He was the great-grandson of Count Franz Ludwig von Holnstein, the illegitimate son of Emperor Charles VII of Bavaria and his mistress Baroness Maria Caroline Charlotte von Ingenheim.

From an early age, Holnstein was playmate and confidants of the Bavarian princes Ludwig (King Ludwig II from 1864) and Otto (King Otto I from 1886).

== Career ==
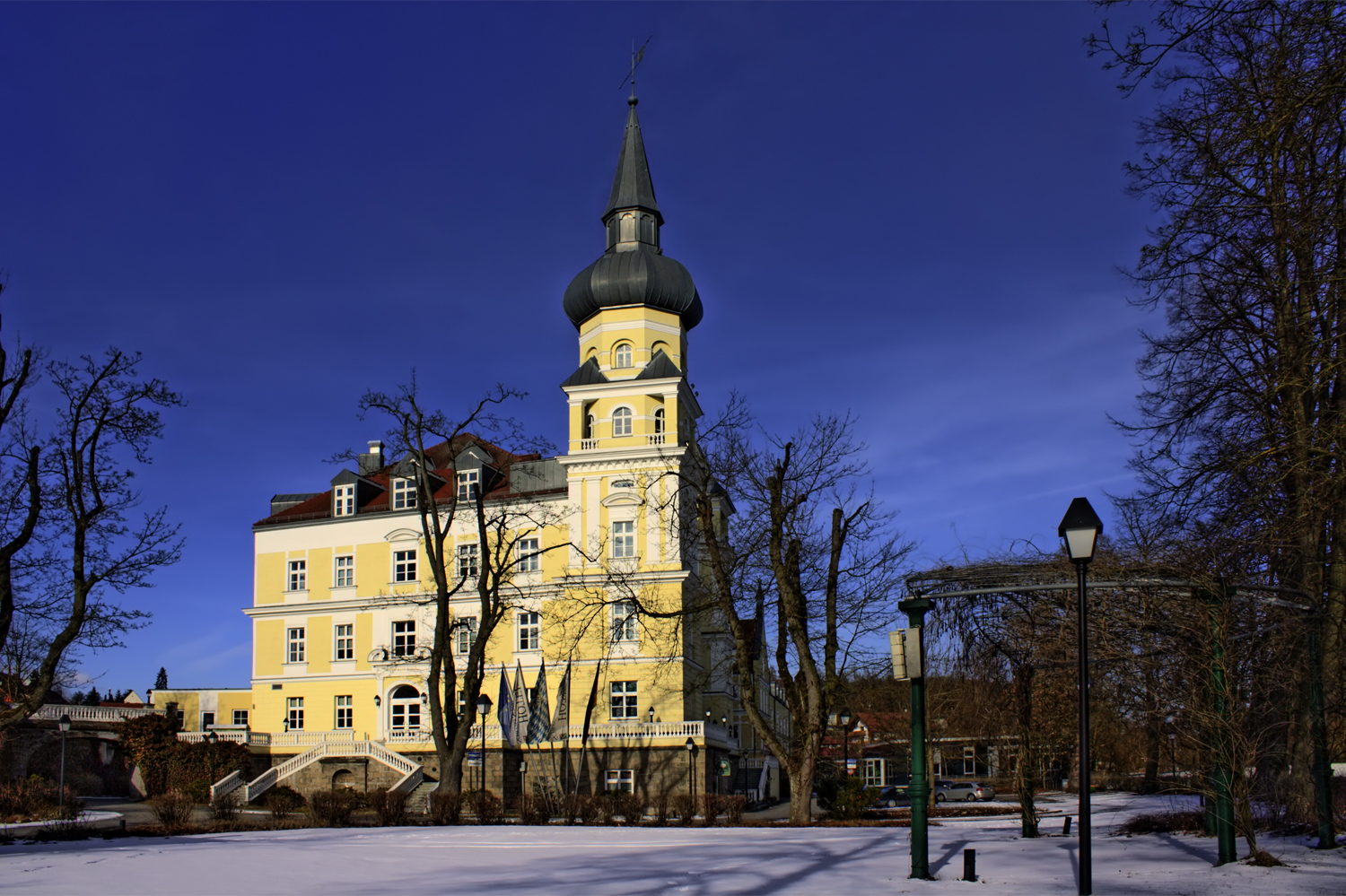
Schwarzenfeld Castle

Since 1794, the Holnstein family owned extensive estates in Schwarzenfeld in the Upper Palatinate, where the family seat, Schwarzenfeld Castle, was located. After the death of his father, Holnstein became a hereditary member of the Kammer der Reichsräte (meaning "House of Councillors"). He took over his family's possessions in Schwarzenfeld, Rauberweiherhaus, Thanstein and Pillmersried in the Upper Palatinate and Thalhausen and Palzing in Upper Bavaria.

In 1863, Holnstein was convicted and sentenced to imprisonment for a legally forbidden honor duel with pistols, but was pardoned by Ludwig II. In 1866, Ludwig II appointed Holnstein Royal Bavarian master of the horse ("Oberstallmeister" in German) as successor to Baron Otto von Lerchenfeld-Aham, whom Ludwig II had dismissed at the end of 1865 because Lerchenfeld had reported a groom, who was considered the king's lover, for an alleged moral offense to the public prosecutor's office. Holnstein has also been claimed as a lover of the king.

In 1868, he was part of the contingent that established the private commercial bank known as Bayerische Vereinsbank (today known as HypoVereinsbank) which was formally established by the King on 11 April 1869.

Holnstein enjoyed Ludwig's confidence and was directly involved in the creation of the "Kaiserbrief" written at Hohenschwangau Castle, which offered the Prussian King William I the imperial dignity of the newly founded German Empire, likely due to Ludwig II's financial difficulties and debts. Holnstein eventually lost Ludwig II's confidence three years before the King's incapacitation because of his opposition to the king's increasing expenditures. He was also involved with Ludwig II being declared "mentally disturbed" and "incurable" by Dr. Bernhard von Gudden and Dr. Hubert von Grashey and Holnstein was appointed the king's guardian. After King Ludwig II died, Holnstein remained chief equerry for Prince Regent Luitpold until 1892.

=== Later life ===
Holnstein retired to his castle in Schwarzenfeld in 1893, which he had lived in since 1857. Between 1890 and 1892, he had Julius Hofmann (the engineer behind Neuschwanstein Castle) extend the castle and construct the outbuilding and the two towers in the historic style. Holnstein lived in the castle until his death in 1895 after which he was buried in the mausoleum, built at his behest between 1882 and 1884, in the Schwarzenfeld cemetery, where his family was also buried.

== Personal life ==
On 18 May 1867, Holnstein was married to Baroness Maximiliane von Gumppenberg (1850–1937), a daughter of Baroness Caroline von Bayrstorff and Adolf, Baron von Gumppenberg. Baroness Maximiliane's maternal grandparents were Prince Karl Theodor of Bavaria and, his first wife, Marie-Anne-Sophie Petin (who was created Baroness von Bayrstorff in 1823). Her grandfather was the second son of King Maximilian I of Bavaria and his first wife Princess Augusta Wilhelmine of Hesse-Darmstadt and was the brother of Princess Charlotte of Bavaria, wife of William I, King of Württemberg and, after their divorce, wife of Franz I, Emperor of Austria. Together, Maximilian and Maximiliane were the parents of:

- Ludwig Carl, Count von Holnstein aus Bayern (1868–1930), who married Maria Apushkina (1869–1924) in 1894. They divorced in 1903 and he married Anna von Alvensleben (1865–1945) in 1904.
- Countess Caroline von Holnstein aus Bayern (1870–1915), who married Baron Otto von Ritter zu Groenesteyn (1864–1940) in 1888.
- Count Carl von Holnstein aus Bayern (1877–1916), who married American heiress Mildred Harrison (1879–1942), a daughter of Alfred Craven Harrison, in 1905.

Holnstein died at Schwarzenfeld on 1 February 1895. His widow Maximiliane and his descendants moved out in 1907, and the castle remained unused for a long periods apart from several short-term leases. In 1936, financial difficulties forced Maximiliane to sell the castle to the National Socialist People's Welfare shortly before her death in 1937.
