= Caroline von Holnstein =

German noble and painting subject (1815–1859)

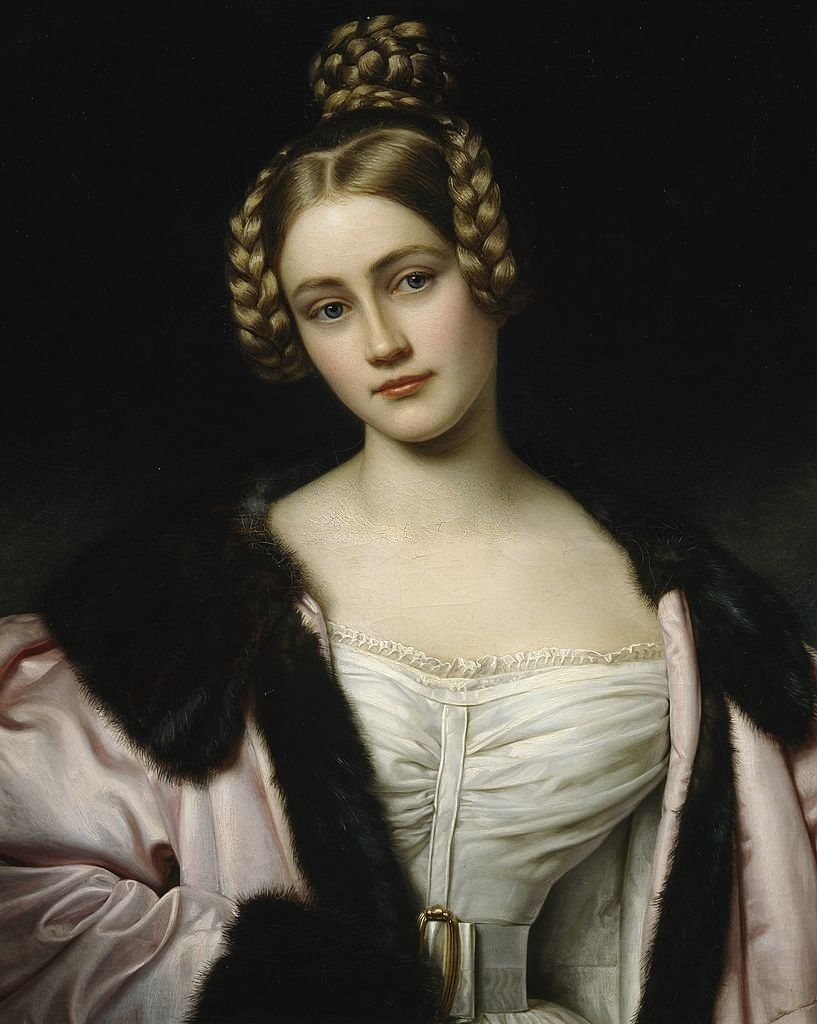
- Portrait of Caroline von Holnstein by Joseph Karl Stieler, 1834
- Born: Baroness Caroline Maximiliana Maria von Spiering; 8 May 1815; Schloss Fronberg, Schwandorf, Kingdom of Bavaria
- Died: 24 July 1859 (aged 44); Schloss Fronberg, Schwandorf, Kingdom of Bavaria
- Spouses: Count Carl Theodor von Holnstein (m. 1831; died 1857) Wilhelm, Baron von Künsberg (after 1857)
- Children: 7
- Parent(s): Baron Karl Theodor von Spiering; Baroness Johanna Nepumukena von Enzberg

Baroness Caroline von Spiering, Countess von Holnstein, Baroness von Künsberg (8 May 1815, Fronberg Castle, Schwandorf – 24 July 1859, Fronberg Castle, Schwandorf) was a German noblewoman, best known for her appearance in the Gallery of Beauties.

== Early life ==
Baroness Caroline Maximiliana Maria von Spiering was the fifth child of Baron Carl Theodor von Spiering and his wife, Baroness Johanna Nepumukena von Enzberg.

After her father's death in 1829 she began looking for a suitable husband, eventually marrying Count von Holnstein in 1831. It was no love-match, though it did mean that the Holnstein lands passed in the direct line to the Baroness von Spiering. Caroline moved into the Palais Holnstein in Munich, where her husband's position opened many doors for her at court, though life among the nobility bored her. On 8 December 1833 Ludwig I of Bavaria first saw her at a court academy.

== Personal life ==
On 9 November 1831, aged 16, she married 34-year-old Count Carl Theodor von Holnstein aus Bayern (1797–1857), the son of Maximilian Joseph, Count of Holnstein, and his wife Princess Maria Josepha of Hohenlohe-Waldenburg-Schillingsfürst (eldest daughter of Prince Charles Albert II). His grandfather, Count Franz Ludwig von Holnstein, was the illegitimate son of Emperor Charles VII of Bavaria and his mistress Maria Caroline Charlotte von Ingenheim. Together, they were the parents of:

- Count Karl Theodor von Holnstein aus Bayern (1832–1832), who died at birth
- Countess Johanna von Holnstein aus Bayern (1833–1833), who died at birth
- Count Maximilian Carl Theodor von Holnstein aus Bayern (1835–1895), who was a playmate of princes Ludwig and Otto (both later kings of Bavaria); he brought Ludwig's "Kaiserbrief" to Otto von Bismarck

Count von Holnstein died in 1857 and his estates, including Schwarzenfeld Castle, were inherited by their only surviving son, Maximilian.

=== Second marriage ===
While married to the Count von Holnstein, Caroline met and fell in love with the married nobleman Baron Wilhelm von Künsberg, who returned her affections in secret. When Wilhelm's wife died she lived with him at Schloss Fronberg, her Spiering residence, and he left the cuirassiers at her behest. Reportedly, Count von Holnstein tolerated the relationship but refused her an official separation, even going so far as to have her legitimate and illegitimate children educated together. Only the Count's death cleared Caroline's way to marry Wilhelm. she married Baron von Künsberg on 21 September 1857 at the Pilgrimage church of Kreuzberg in Schwandorf. Her illegitimate children were legitimized during her lifetime and on 7 July 1859 they were raised to the Bavarian Freiherrenstand with the title Künsberg Freiherr von Fronberg.

- Baron Wilhelm Maximilian Künsberg von Fronberg (1838–1909)
- Baroness Wilhelmine Maria Caroline Künsberg von Fronberg (1841–1889)
- Baron Johann Friedrich Wilhelm Karl Künsberg von Fronberg (1842–1876)
- Baron Rudolf Philipp Wilhelm Goswin Karl Künsberg von Fronberg (b. 1844)

She died at Schloss Fronberg on 24 July 1859 and was buried there in a sarcophagus in a room adjacent to the castle chapel.

== In popular culture ==
The painting of her in the Gallery of Beauties is 71.5 cm by 58 cm. On its back is written "Caroline Gräfin Holnstein aus Bayern geborene Freyin von Spiering erblickte das Licht der Welt auf dem Gute Frohnberg in Bayern dem 8. Mai 1815. Gemalt von J. Stieler 1834" ("Caroline countess Holnstein in Bavaria née baroness von Spiering born at dem Gute Frohnberg in Bavaria on 8 May 1815. Painted by J. Stieler 1834"). It was still in the artist's studio on 18 February 1834 and was paid for in May that year.
