= Imperial plan of 1870 =

The Imperial Plan of 1870 was a diplomatic initiative set out by the Prussian Minister President and Federal Chancellor of the North German Confederation, Otto von Bismarck. Accordingly, the Prussian King was able to assume the title of German Emperor.

== Starting position and reactions ==
Since the end of the Austro-Prussian War in 1866 and the foundation of the North German Confederation by Prussia in 1867, the policy for unification had been stalled. As a rule, the southern German states were not affected by the idea of joining the North German Confederation. In this situation, Bismarck wondered how to keep the German question moving.

On 7 January 1870, Bismarck discussed his plan with the Prussian Crown Prince Frederick William, who had good connections to England. Later, the British Ambassador, who had spoken to the Crown Prince, showed his benevolence, and agreed to make contact with France. As expected, Paris responded with protest. Bismarck had already assumed that his initiative would take a long time.

Surprisingly, the anti-Protestant politician Nepomuk Sepp in the Second Chamber of Bavaria expressed a positive attitude, at least not disagreeing about a German emperor. If it had gone to a new National Assembly like in Frankfurt, he could have also believed in a united Germany. Bismarck received the help of Julius Fröbel with the intention of finding the Kaisertitel, Title of the Emperor, only in Southern Germany and especially in Bavaria, and only then to visit the European level again.

However, the imperial plan was in the shadow of the Hohenzollers' succession in Spain from April 1870. Later, in December during the Franco-Prussian War, the Reichstag approved the request of the Federal Council to include the title of German Emperor in the constitution, and on 18 January 1871, the Prussian King was proclaimed Emperor in Versailles (Imperial Proclamation).

== Motives ==
The Emperor's plan was to rename the Prussian Foreign Office to North German Foreign Office. The question of the further development of the North German Federal Level also emerged. Bismarck's plans for the imperial plan were:

- The idea of German unity was ignited
- Before the forthcoming governmental debates on the military budget later in 1870, a prestige gain from the King would have been an advantage
- The previous title of the Prussian King in the North German Confederation, presidency, was impractical in diplomatic traffic.

At the end of 1870, the Prussian King William I was vehemently against the Emperor's title. It was his concern that this title was going to be artificial, surpass the Prussian royal title, and not be recognised by other monarchs.

== See also ==
- Imperial Sovereign
- Founding of the German Empire
- Imperial Letter from November 1870
