= Schwarzenfeld Castle =

Castle in Schwarzenfeld, Bavaria, Germany

Coordinates: 49.3895°N 12.1414°E

- Interactive map of the Schwarzenfeld Castle area

General information
- Location: Germany

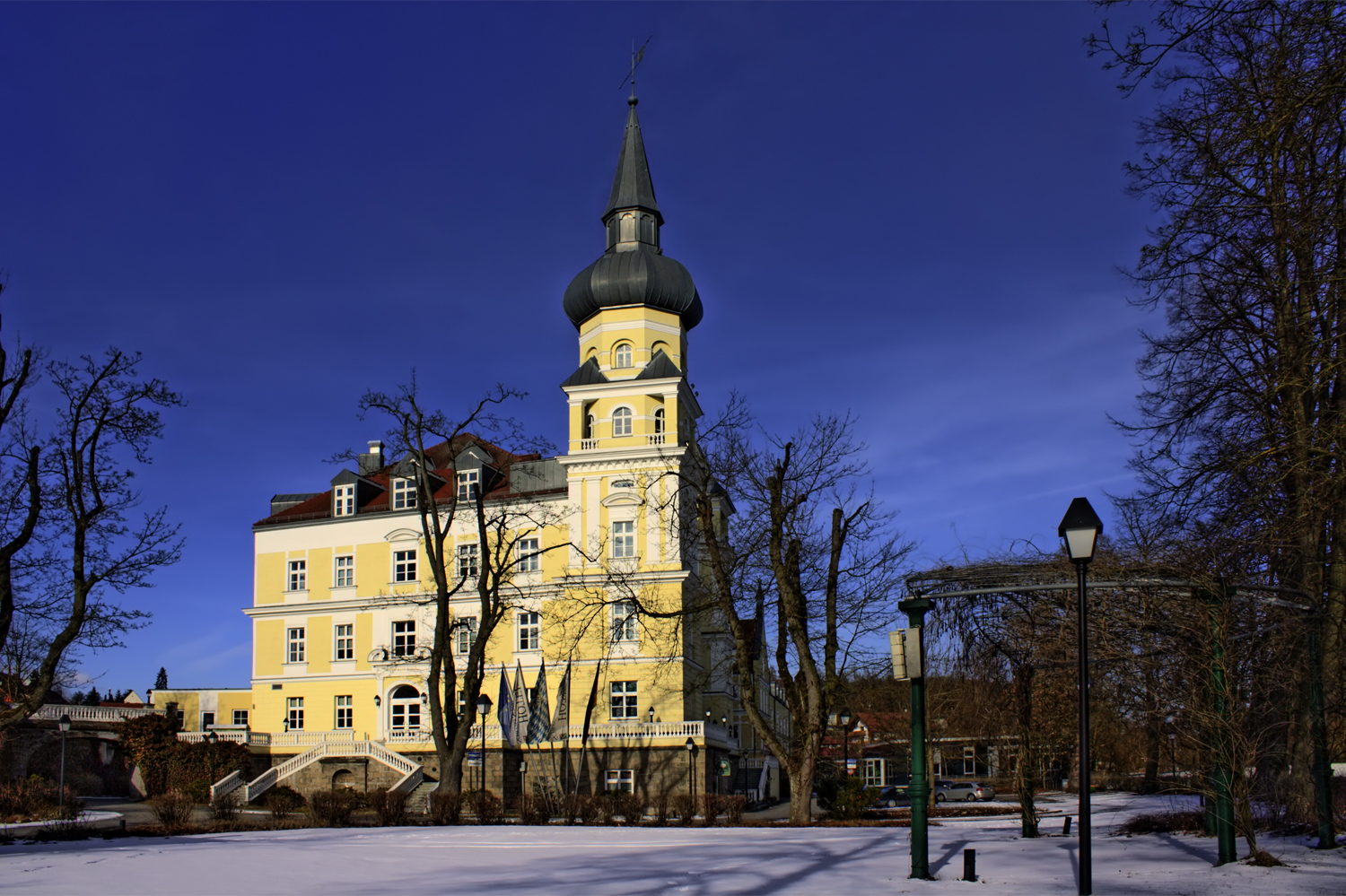
Schwarzenfeld Castle, 2009

Schwarzenfeld Castle (German: Schloss Schwarzenfeld) is a historic castle in Schwarzenfeld in the district of Schwandorf in Upper Palatinate of Bavaria, Germany. It was the home of noble Holnstein family, including Count Maximilian von Holnstein, a close advisor to King Ludwig II of Bavaria.

== History ==
The history of the Schwarzenfeld Castle goes back to the first half of the second millennium. Schwarzenfeld is first mentioned in 1015 in a deed of donation from Emperor Henry II to the Diocese of Bamberg (which Henry II created from parts of the Diocese of Würzburg and Eichstätt). Schwarzenfeld Castle was built by Conrad Pullenhofer on the Naab (a tributary of the Danube) in 1372. In 1389, the noble family of Plankenfelser, who came from Upper Franconia, took over the Castle. At the end of the 16th century, the Teuffel von Pirkensee family bought the estate, which had been devastated during the Thirty Years' War along with the village of Schwarzenfeld.

=== Holnstein family ===
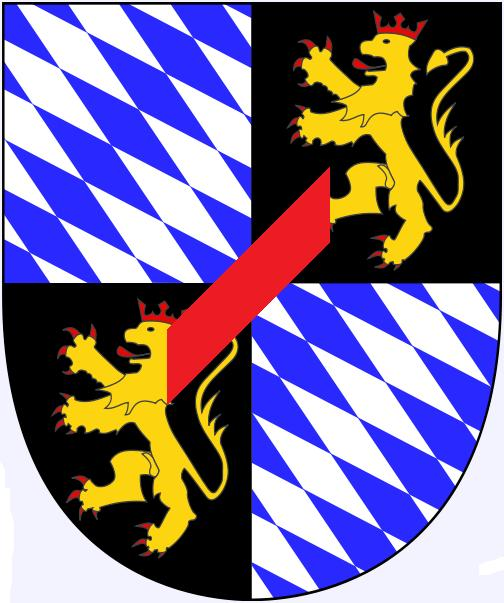
Coat of arms of the "Grafen von Holnstein aus Bayern"

After changing hands several more times, Count Maximilian Joseph von Holnstein, the hereditary governor of the Upper Palatinate, acquired Schwarzenfeld in 1789. Count Holnstein was a grandson of Emperor Charles VII of Bavaria (by his mistress Maria Caroline Charlotte von Ingenheim), and was married to Princess Maria Josepha of Hohenlohe-Waldenburg-Schillingsfürst (eldest daughter of Prince Charles Albert II).

After Count Holnstein died in 1824, Schwarzenfeld was inherited by his son, Count Carl Theodor von Holnstein, the first husband of celebrated beauty Caroline von Holnstein of Schloss Fronberg. Upon the death of Count Carl in 1857, Schwarzenfeld was inherited by his only son, Count Maximilian von Holnstein, the most famous member of the von Holnstein family. Between 1890 and 1892, Holnstein had Julius Hofmann (the engineer behind Neuschwanstein Castle) rebuild and enlarge the castle to include its outbuildings and the two towers in the "historicism" style. Holnstein retired to his castle in Schwarzenfeld in 1893 and lived there until his death in 1895.

Count Holnstein's widow Maximiliane (née Baroness von Gumppenberg-Pöttmes) lived in the castle until 1907 when the family moved to Upper Bavaria. The Castle remained unused for a long period of time apart from several short-term leases. In 1934, Maximilian's grandson, Count Ludwig Maximilian von Holnstein (1897–1966), sold the castle to the market town of Schwarzenfeld.

=== Present day ===
The castle changed hands frequently, including to the National Socialist People's Welfare, before a major fire broke out on 25 June 1982. In 1995, Hans Nabburg sold the castle ruins to investors who converted it into a conference hotel with the foundation stone being laid on 15 September 1995 by the Bavarian Prime Minister Edmund Stoiber.

Today the Castle is the site of the Annual Shell Show and Fair, and continues to operate as a convention center and luxury hotel.

=== Gallery ===
Map of Schwarzenfeld, c. 1682

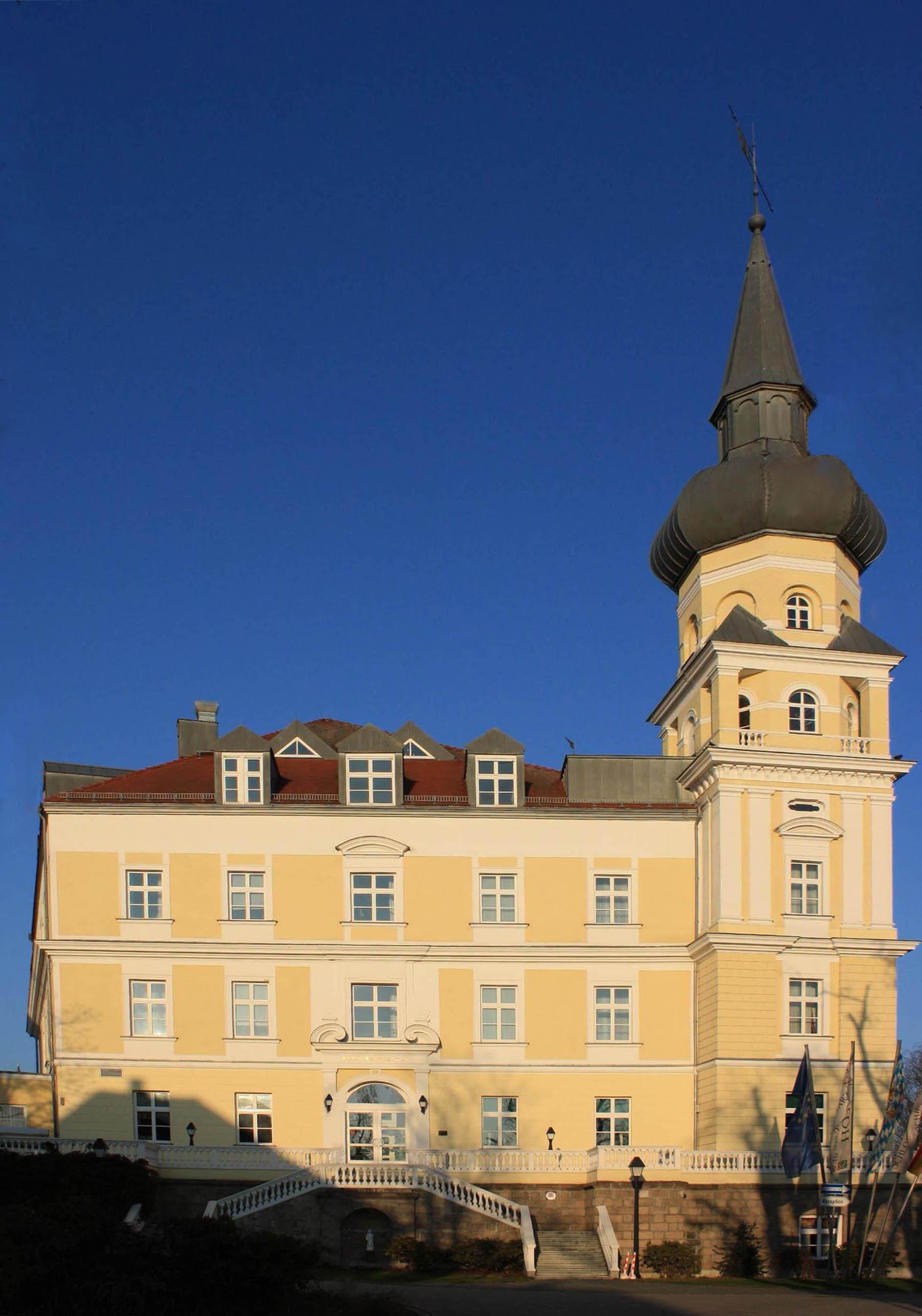
Photograph of the castle, 2008

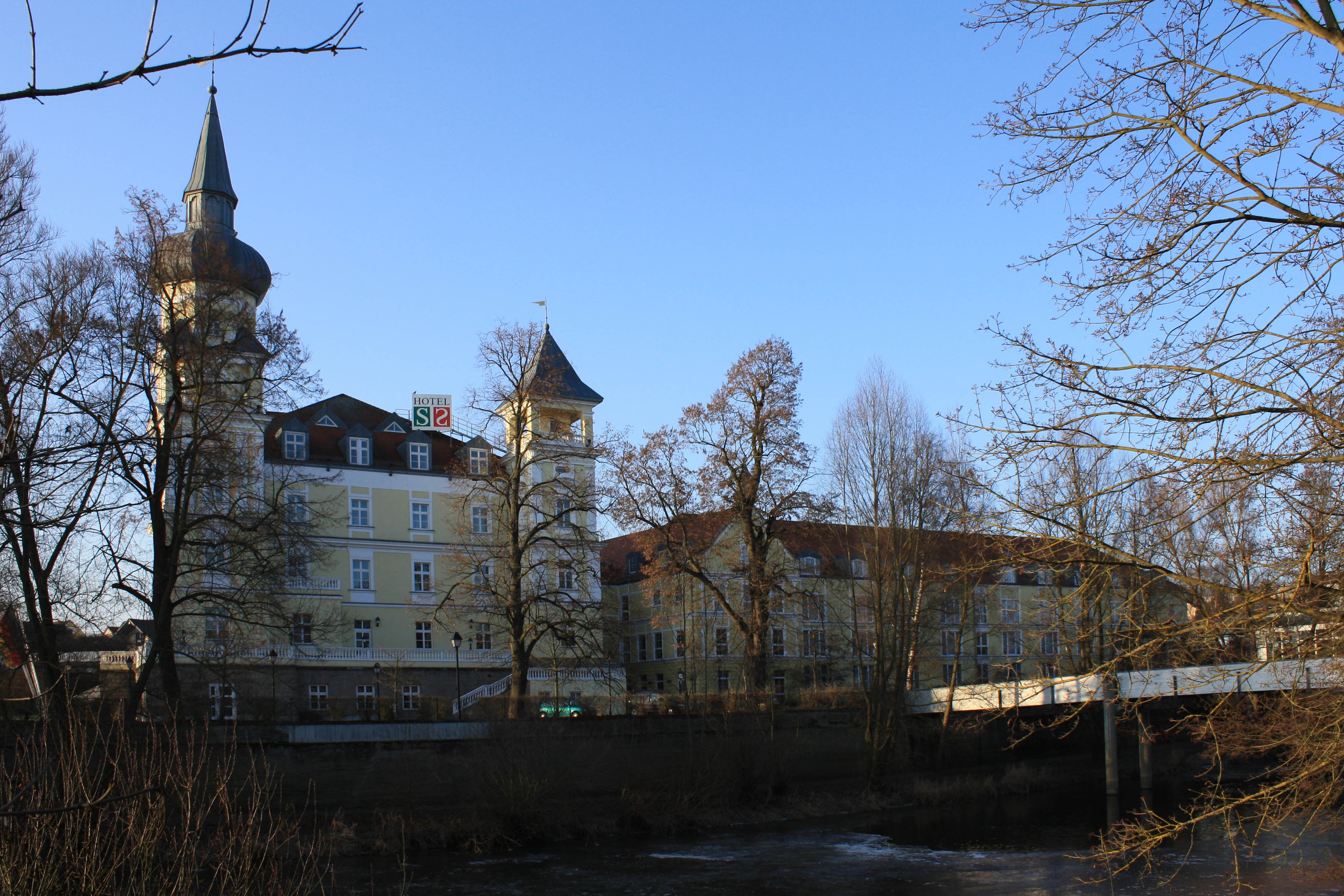
Photograph of the castle, 2008

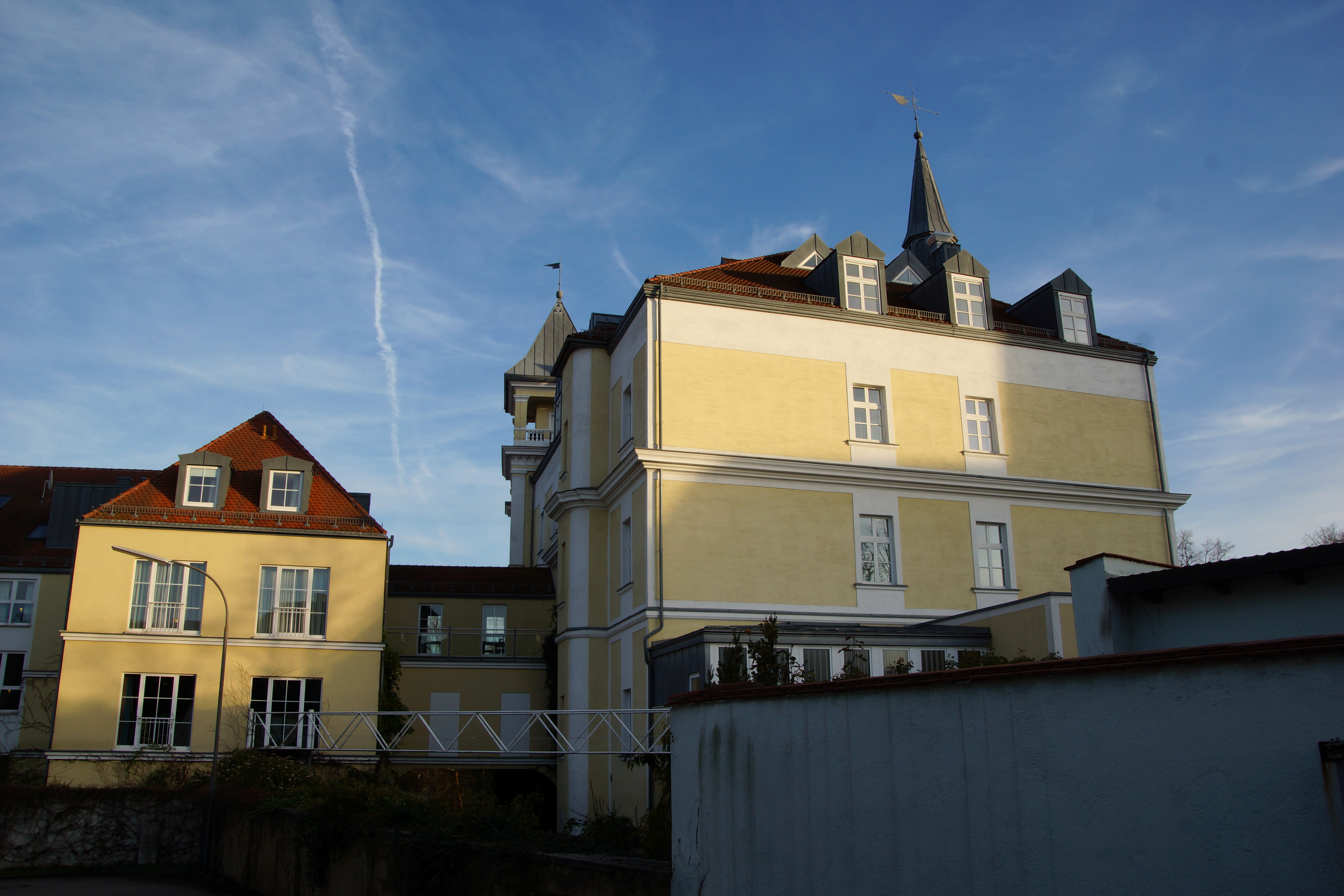
Photograph of the castle, 2017

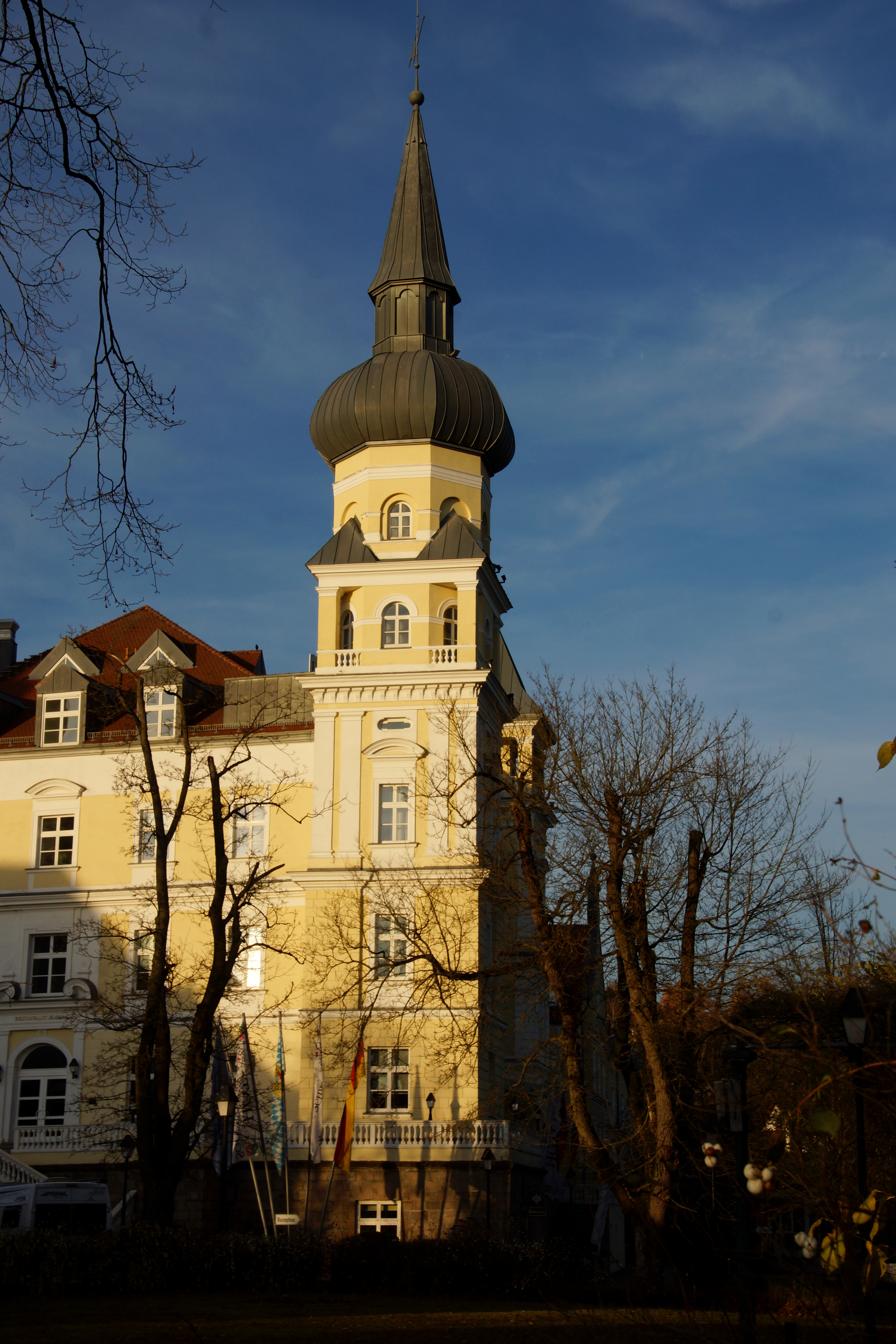
Detail of the tower of the castle, 2017
