= Imperial Sovereign =

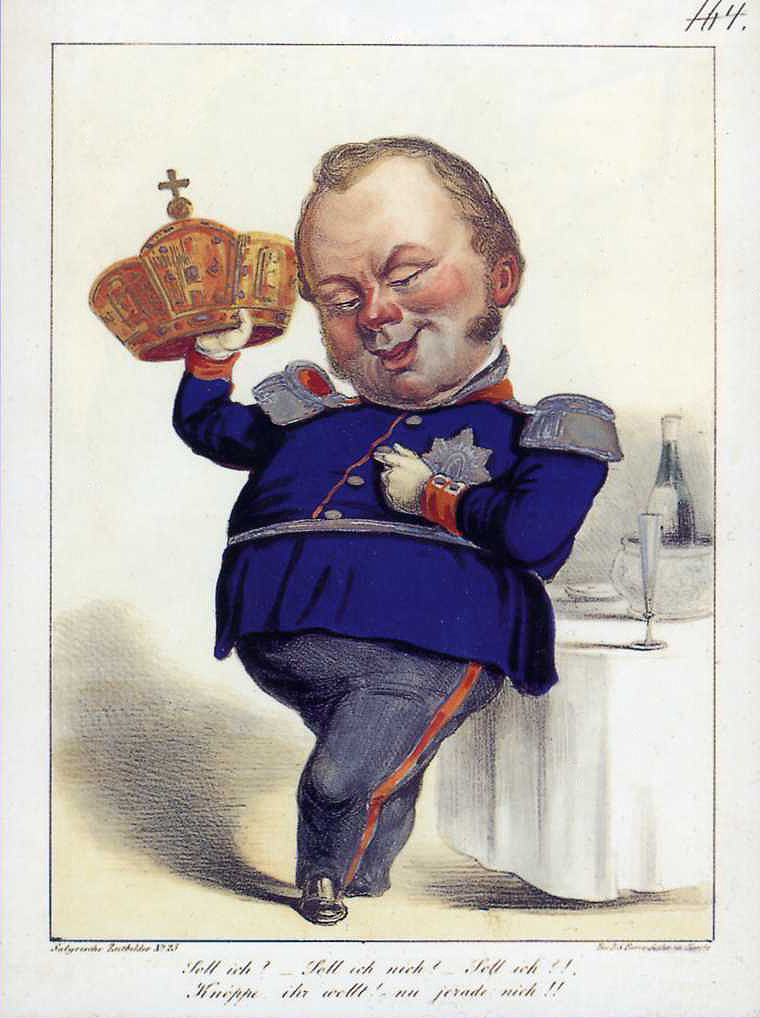
The Prussian King, Frederick William IV, in a contemporary caricature with the Frankfurt imperial crown. He makes his decision dependent on the counting of his uniform buttons: "Should I?, Should I not?, Should I?, Knöppe, you want! No not yet!"

The question of an Imperial Sovereign or emperor was a central issue in Germany's attempts at unification from 1848 to 1850. Both the draft constitutional act with its provision for centralised power as well as the constitutional plans at that time, laid down how a German head of state would be selected for office and what rights they were to have.

In the Frankfurt Constitution of 28 March 1849, it was envisaged that an emperor would be the 'imperial sovereign'. Although the National Assembly voted for the first incumbent of this office, thereafter it was assumed that the office would be hereditary. The emperor was to be inviolable as a constitutional monarch, but would appoint responsible ministers.

Frederick William IV, King of Prussia, rejected the imperial dignity which had been proposed to him. Instead, he tried unsuccessfully to unite Germany in his own authority. Under the terms of the Erfurt Union, which he proposed, the Imperial Sovereign was first and foremost the Reichsvorstand (Imperial Executive), and then the Unionvorstand (Union Executive). The Unionvorstand had to share certain rights with other princes, above all, the veto of proposed laws.

== Background and terminology ==
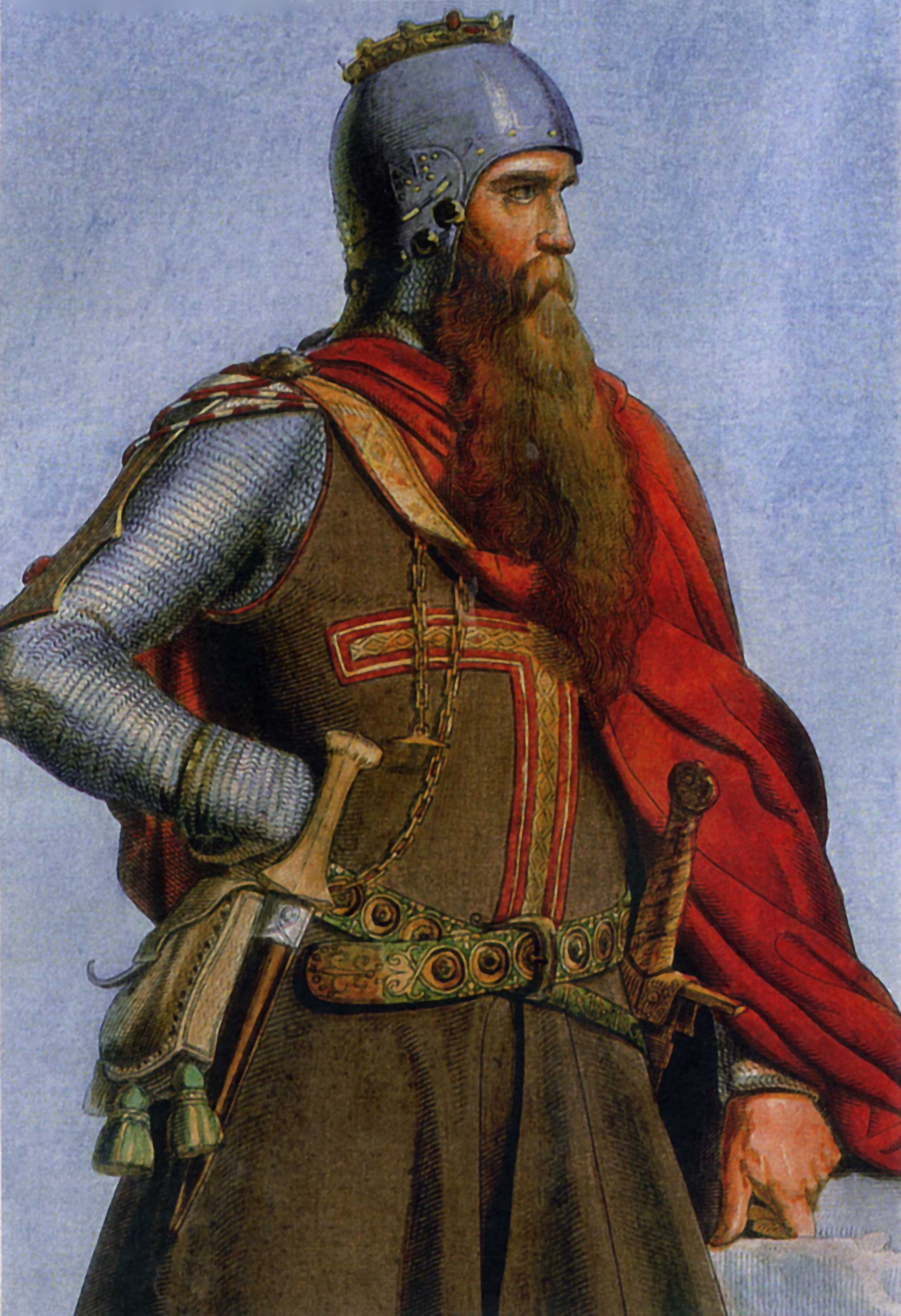
Emperor Barbarossa, coloured copper engraving from 1847

The title of Emperor originally came from the ancient Roman Empire and was familiar, not least because of its use in the medieval Holy Roman Empire. It had become natural that the German king also had the title of Holy Roman Emperor. For centuries, this had been the head of the Austrian House of Habsburg until, in 1806, the Empire was dissolved under pressure from Napoleon. The renunciation of imperial Holy Roman crown was made easier for Austria, because it was allowed by Napoleon to elevate itself to become the empire of Austria.

In the German Confederation from 1815, there was no emperor. The supreme body was a Federal Assembly (often called the Bundestag) with the presidency held by Austria. The romanticism of the time, however, meant there was a romantic idealisation of the medieval empire combined with the notion of a mighty emperor. One of the focal points of such fantasies was the 12th-century emperor, Frederick Barbarossa, who, according to the Kyffhäuser legend, slept in the mountains there, but would return one day to unite Germany.

As early as 1814-15, when the establishment of the German Confederation was still being discussed, Baron vom Stein had demanded a German emperor as head of the federation. Up to 34 smaller and medium-sized states followed suit. But the disunity between Prussia and Austria, as well as that between the other larger states, meant that this was not realised, either in the form of an emperor or of a directorate (Direktorium) or committee (Deutscher Ausschuss) made up of the five largest states. As Stein explained to the Russian Tsar in a memorandum on 17 February 1815, Austria was to appoint the German Emperor in order to bind it firmly to Germany.

In the years 1848 to 1850, further terms were proposed, which either avoided or concealed the monarchical character of a German head of state: Reichsoberhaupt ("imperial head of state"), Reichsvorstand ("imperial executive") or Reichsverweser ("imperial administrator"). These terms could be interpreted variously to mean either an elected president or a prince as primus inter pares. (Note: Primus inter pares: first among equals in a cabinet of several people, referred to as a Direktorium or 'directorate'.)

When the terms "imperial authority" (Reichsgewalt) or "central authority" (Zentralgewalt) were used, they meant the "state" in the sense of the highest level of federal government, equivalent to the federal level in Germany today. Thus a distinction was made between the authority of the central power and that of the individual states within the Empire. The question then remained of who should exercise this central authority. In most cases, they envisaged a monarch whose power was limited by: a constitution, a body representing the people and by ministerial answerability. The terms "government" (Regierung) or "imperial government" (Reichsregierung) could mean the monarch and his ministers or just the ministers themselves (as the electable part of the government).

== Revolution and attempted Imperial Reform, March–May 1848 ==
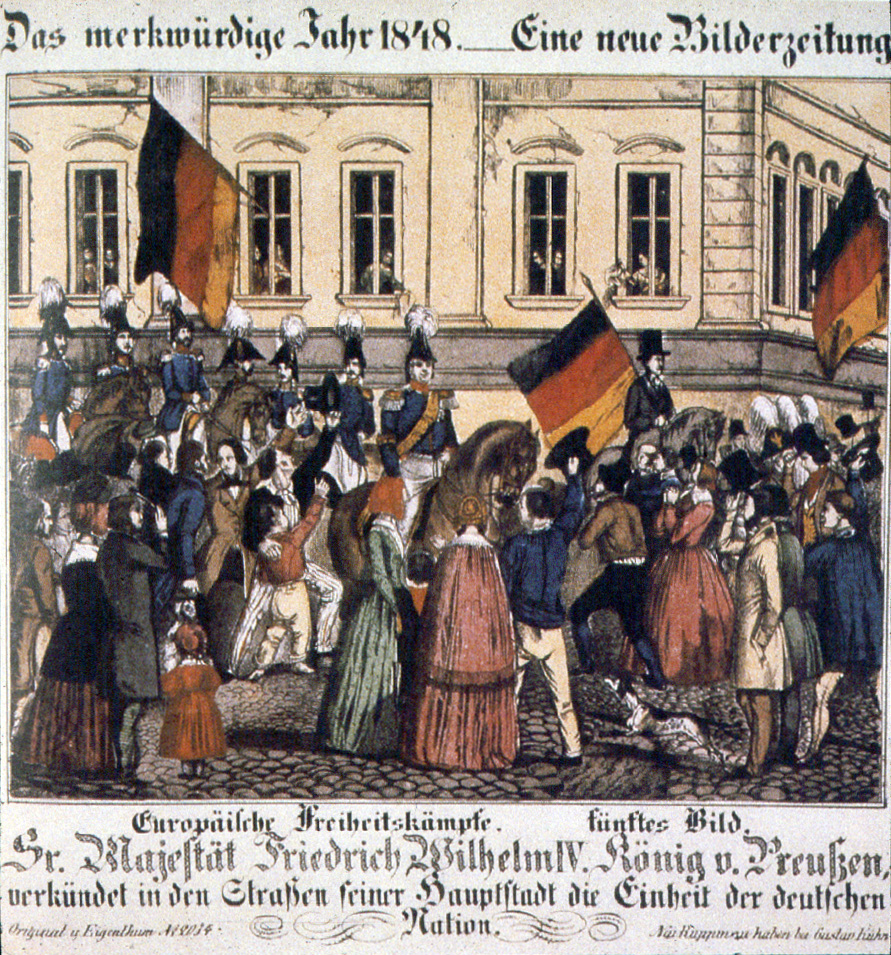
After the violent events on 18 March in Berlin, King Frederick William IV promised that he would put himself forward as the head of the national unity movement.

Joseph von Radowitz wrote a memorandum in 1847 On behalf of the Prussian King, which on 15 March resulted in an Austrian-Prussian conference plan. The memorandum alluded to a central authority, but remained silent about a possible German head of state. In his proposal of 12 February, Bassmann, a representative from Baden, mentioned chambers at the Bundestag and uniform national institutions, but no head of state. On the other hand, Heinrich von Gagern explicitly mentioned in his motion of 28 February an interim head of Germany, who was to appoint a responsible cabinet.

In March 1848, disturbances arose across German states similar to those seen in the French Revolution of 1848. The frightened German monarchs installed liberal governments, and delegated liberal envoys to the Bundestag. The conventional wisdom among the people was that the time had come for a unified Germany and to provide it with a modern constitution. The Bundestag elected a national assembly, which would draft a constitution and unite governments.

Even before the election, the Bundestag set up a committee which made a constitutional proposal for a national federal state, the Draft of the Seventeen (Note: The Draft of the Seventeen: so-called, because it was produced by a committee of 17 trusted delegates.) was issued on 26 April 1848. In the preface, the draft emphasized the importance of establishing a strong imperial sovereign in order to guarantee and achieve German unity. The Imperial Sovereign, known as Kaiser, had to be inviolable with ministers accountable to him. As far as law-making, he was to have a coequal responsibility to that of the Reichstag, the partially elected parliament. This draft was the first one put forth during the March Revolutions which provided for a hereditary emperor, according to Jörg-Detlef Kühne. Although the draft had no formal status, it was nevertheless an influential model for the later imperial constitution of 28 March 1849.

A further development took place in the Bundestag itself. There was a plan to set up a federal executive committee to finally give the federal government an executive. The three members had to be representatives form Austria and Prussia. For the third, Bavaria had to make a proposal list and the other individual states of the Council of Engers (of the Bundestag) would choose the third. However, because the national assembly would soon meet on 18 May, the Bundestag did not set up this body.

== National Assembly ==
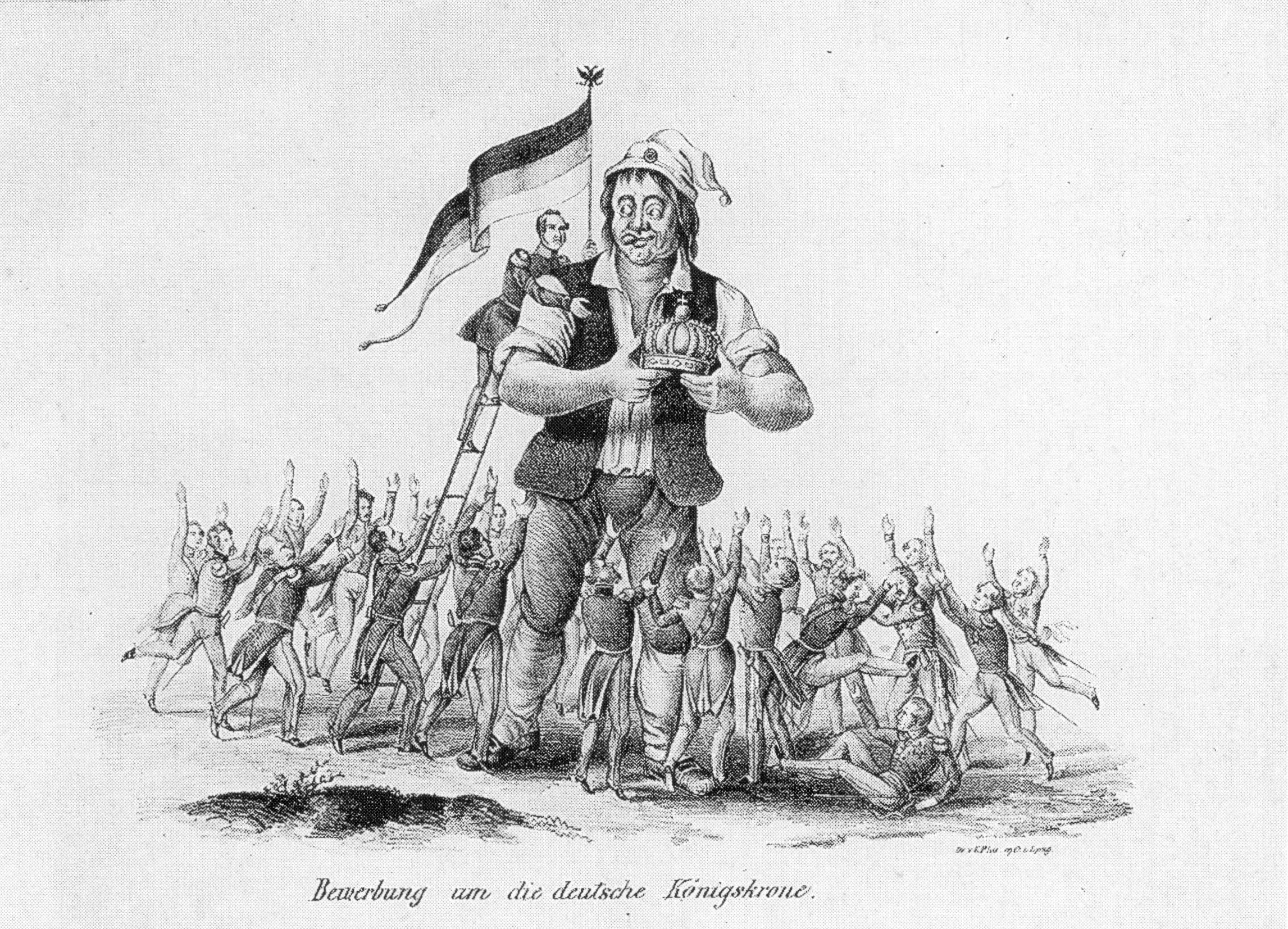
Caricature of the (supposed) enthusiasm of German princes, to be the crowned head of Germany. Frederick William IV rises on the shoulder of the Deutscher Michel.

The National Assembly immediately wanted to establish a provisional constitution order with a provisional central executive. According to Ernst Rudolf Huber, "the absence of a central power [...] was the core element of the old Federal Constitution". There were now seven different solutions to the debate, which continued until March 1849.

1. A Democratic-Republican leader (President) who served for a fixed term of four, five or seven years. He would be chosen by the people or the people's representative. This was supported by the Democrats and partly by the left-wing centre of the National Assembly.
2. A dynastic Republican sovereign. Only a member of a governing princely house could be elected. He could be elected by the people or the people's representatives.
3. A democratic directorate, with three, five or seven members. Any citizen could be chosen. For this solution, the federalist thinkers were among the Democrats.
4. A democratic directorate, the governing princes would have been elective or permanently appointed princes of certain states. An example was the proposed "Prince Electoral Council of the Three Uncles", Archduke John (Uncle to Austrian Emperor Ferdinand), Prince Wilhelm the Elder (Uncle to the Prussian King, Frederick William IV) and Prince Karl Theodor (Uncle to the Bavarian King, Maximilian II).
5. An electoral empire, with an emperor elected by the people or parliament for life. A member of a dynasty or only a ruling prince could be elected. This solution was favoured mainly by the left-centre.
6. Alternating sovereigns, with the Austrian Fürst for the first six years, and then the Prussian one for the next six.
7. Hereditary emperorship, The very first official was to be elected. Only a dynastic member or a Fürst was eligible. Afterward, the crown would be inherited. In the Emperorship, occupied by a ruling prince, a permanent personal union of Imperial Head of State and Territorial Prince would have arisen. The Austrian Emperor and the King of Prussia were the only ones considered. For the hereditary emperor as a solution came those who desired a single and effective empire against the individual states.

=== Provisional Constitution ===
On 3 June 1848, the National Assembly adopted a committee of 15 members, who proposed a three-member board with a majority of eleven to four votes. Governments had to propose this and agree to the National Assembly. The Board set up a ministry (a government) which would be responsible for the National Assembly.

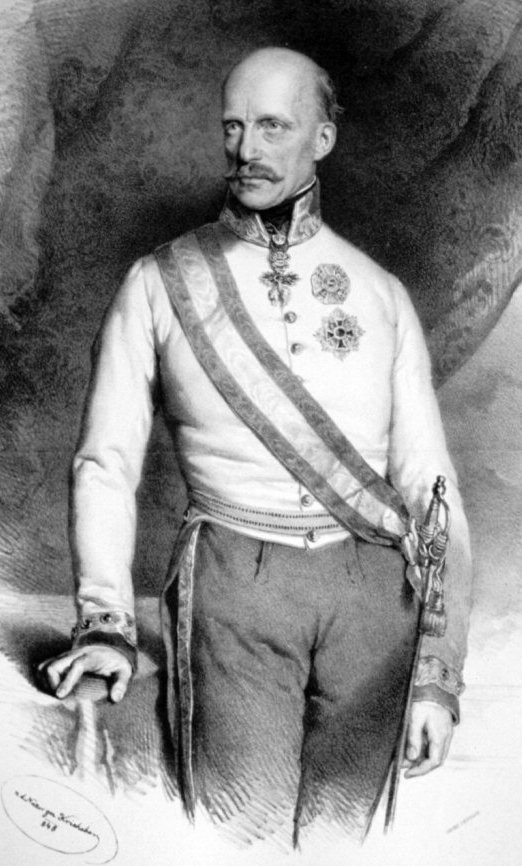
Archduke John of Austria, Reichsverweser of the German Empire from 29 June 1848 to 20 December 1849.

The Democratic minority of the Fifteen-Committee, on the other hand, thought of an executive committee. The chairman would be elected by the National Assembly and then the other members of the committee. The majority of the National Assembly could at any time dismiss the executive committee. The moderate democrat Robert Blum imagined that the executive committee would essentially send the resolutions of the National Assembly to the Governments for execution. The decisive democrats, on the other hand, demanded that the provisional Imperial Government immediately take over the actual executive power of all of Germany.

The majority did not want to leave the familiar ground of the former constitutional right. Although the Imperial Government was responsible parliamentary, yet they turned against a pure parliamentary rule, following the example of the Convention in the French Revolution. The left-centre also did not want the National Assembly to recall the president as the head of the executive.

On 24 June, Heinrich von Gagern, the liberal president of the National Assembly, brought an end to the various proposals and thus the debate from 19 to 25 June. He called on the National Assembly to use a provisional central authority on its own (in a "bold grip"). On 28 June, a majority of the National Assembly voted in favour of the Central Power Act and the following day for the election of Archduke John to Reichsverweser. A Reichsverweser was traditionally the official who governed until the establishment of the final monarch. John of Austria was popular among the people and was thus most likely to be acceptable to the left, on the other hand, he was a high-ranking noble of the Right. Reichsverweser John then set up the first Reichsministerium, the real government of the emerging German Empire, in July and August.

=== Debates about the Imperial Constitution ===
In January 1849, a campaign for a referendum erupted in the National Assembly, which highlighted the many differing opinions there. On 19 January 1849, the majority, with 339 votes to 122, rejected the request of the moderate left and the more pronounced "Entschiedenen Linken" leftists to institute an elected imperial ruler for a fixed term (any German could stand for election). In further votes, only 97 deputies voted for a directorate, only 80 for an alternating rulership, 39 for an elected Imperial Sovereign with lifetime tenure, 14 for twelve-year term, 196 for a six-year term, 120 for a three-year term. The only thing a majority of delegates agreed on, was that the Imperial Sovereign should bear the title "German Kaiser" (Kaiser der Deutschen) and that it should not be hereditary (but also not elected).

The deputies at the National Assembly usually consisted of groups named after the inns in which they met. Historical and political terms such as decisive democrats or constitutional liberals, as well as descriptions of sites such as the left, the right, the left-centre, etc. were grouped at the end of 1848 by perhaps the most important individual question in the National Assembly: Greater or Lesser Germany.

At the beginning of the National Assembly, it was taken for granted that Austria belonged to Germany. However, much of the Austrian state was outside the German Confederation, whose borders were, in principle, also those of the new German Empire. Even in Austria within the imperial borders, many people lived without a German mother tongue. If Germany were to become a national state, Austria had to decide either

- Greater German Solution - Austria is divided into a German and a non-German part. The Austrian Emperor could remain head of state in both areas but they must have separate constitutions and administrations.
- Lesser German Solution - Austria remains outside of Germany, with which it is linked by a kind of state bond.

In order for the plans of Austria being included in the Empire, Austria made a dash on 3 March 1849. On 11 March, the National Assembly learned that the Austrian emperor had signed a new constitution. Austria had become a single overall state, and, as a whole, wanted to join a covenant which had a directorate, but not an actual popular representation.

=== Decisive votes and imperial election ===
The right-liberals of the Casino faction were mostly for a hereditary emperor. They wanted to choose the Prussian King. This hereditary party had the majority of the Constitutional Committee but not in the entire National Assembly. The Germans gathered in the Mainlust guest house and the news from Vienna took the wind out of their sails. One of their leaders, Carl Theodor Welcker, swung into the camp of Weidensbusch. On 12 March, he surprisingly proposed that the constitutional consultations were completed quickly:

- Outside forces tried to interfere with German constitutional development
- The entire present imperial constitution on its first reading, taking into account the wishes of the governments, was to be adapted as a whole in a single decision. The later Reichstag would have to be improved.
- German-Austria may at any time join the German Federal State.

Welcker's request was rejected by 283 votes (right, left) against 252 (middle). The Reichsministerium resigned but remained in office. Heinrich Simon and the managing minister of the Empire, Heinrich von Gagern succeeded in organising a majority for the content of the Welcker's request (Pact - Simon-Gagern). A group of hereditary emperors supported the Democratic right to vote, the left group, however, against hereditary emperors.

On 22 March, deputy Bernhard Eisenstuck asked for the vote on individual paragraphs, but proposals for improvement were only accepted if they were supported by at least 50 deputies. The last section of the Imperial Report was to be voted on. The request was accepted. In the following polls, two important decisions were made on 27 March:

- On the Area of the Empire: The separation of German and non-German countries (which related to Austria) was somewhat milder and reformulated into a set-point. Nevertheless, it remained that Austria could not join as a whole state. Because of the well-known attitude of the Austrian government, Austria was excluded de facto.
- On the Imperial Sovereign: the deputies decided by a vote of 279–255 that the title of Imperial sovereign was to be transferred to a Fürst. By 267–263, deputies decided that the title would be hereditary.

The majority for the hereditary emperor's title came about because four Austrians joined the Germans in protest against the Austrian government. The Lesser German Solution was supported by the centre, parts of the left (Simon-Gagern Pact) as well as some on the right. On 28 March, the National Assembly voted Prussian King Frederick Wilhelm IV as emperor. 290 voted for him, 284 abstained, 29 were absent. The abstentions came mainly from the Greater Germans and the majority of the left.

=== Imperial Constitution of Frankfurt from 28 March 1849 ===
Constitutional chart for the Frankfurt Imperial Constitution of 1849

The Constitution of the German Empire of 28 March 1849 begins with a long definition of the Empire and contains a long list of the jurisdictional privileges at the Empire level versus those of the individual states. This was followed by Article III regarding the Imperial Sovereign (in sections 68-84).

The title of the imperial sovereign is "German Kaiser". According to section 68, the "title of the imperial sovereign is [...] transferred to one of the ruling Fürsts", without expressly saying who actually carries out the transfer. The following paragraph then states that the Feurst in question passes the title on to his first-born son. His civil list (his income) is determined by the Reichstag.

According to the Imperial Constitution, the emperor's powers were:

- Appointing the Reichsminister
- Representing the Empire internationally, appointing diplomats, etc.
- Calling and closing of the Reichstag, dissolving the Volkshaus (according to certain rules)
- Promulgation of laws, legislative initiative, postponing veto of the law
- Pardon and punishment in criminal matters in the competence of the Reichsgericht
- Preservation of imperial peace (against unrest) and disposition over the armed forces
- Employment of civil servants
- Power of government in all matters of the Empire, insofar as the constitution does not assign individual powers from the Reichsgewalt to other bodies.

The emperor was inviolable or irresponsible so he could not be deposed or politically brought to justice. In order to exercise his office, he had to take an oath to the constitution. The legacy of a deceased emperor would have been permanently refused if a regency had been the only possible solution. Moreover, the emperor could only exercise his office if his actions were signed by a minister of the Empire (countersigned). Whom he appointed Reichsminister was once again in the Emperor's personal decision.

The constitution does not say anything about the Reichsregierung, the Reichsministerium or its internal organisation. Even if the emperor dismisses the government, it is not explicitly stated, but had to be interpreted. The Reichsministers were responsible but the constitution does not explain what the content of the responsibility was. The Reichstag has rights to control the government, according to the right of citation of the Reichstag with the government's obligation to provide information. But there is a lack of a vote of mistrust. According to Huber, the parliamentary system was denied, at least formally. But if the German Empire had been established, the government system would have been parliamentary, also because the Reichsministers were allowed to belong to the Volkshaus at the same time.

== Sources ==
- Botzenhart, Manfred [in German] (1977). Deutscher Parlamentarismus in der Revolutionszeit 1848–1850 [German parliamentarianism in the revolutionary period 1848-1850]. Handbuch der Geschichte des deutschen Parlamentarismus [Handbook of German Parliamentarianism] (in German). Düsseldorf: Droste. OCLC 468469206.
- Huber, Ernst Rudolf (1978) [1st pub.1961, num. 100]. "Antrag des Abgeordneten Welcker auf en-bloc-Annahme der Reichsverfassung vom 12. März 1849" [Request by Deputy Welcker Regarding the En-bloc Acceptance of the Weimar Constitution of 12 March 1849]. Dokumente zur deutschen Verfassungsgeschichte. Band 1: Deutsche Verfassungsdokumente 1803–1850 [Documents from German Constitutional History. Volume 1: German Constitutional Documents 1803-1850] (in German) (3rd ed.). Stuttgart: Kohlhammer Verlag. OCLC 874568240.
- Huber, Ernst Rudolf (1967). Deutsche Verfassungsgeschichte seit 1789. Band I: Reform und Restauration 1789 bis 1830 [German Constitutional History since 1789. Vol 1: Reform and Restoration from 1789 to 1830] (in German). Vol. 1 (2 ed.). Stuttgart: W. Kohlhammer. OCLC 75535169.
- Huber, Ernst Rudolf (1988). Deutsche Verfassungsgeschichte seit 1789. Band II: Der Kampf um Einheit und Freiheit 1830 bis 1850 [German Constitutional History since 1789. Vol 2: The Struggle for Unity and Freedom from 1830 to 1850] (in German). Vol. 2 (3 ed.). Stuttgart: W. Kohlhammer. OCLC 606051060.
- Kühne, Jörg-Detlef [in German] (1998) [1st pub. 1985 (dissertation: Bonn, 1983)]. Die Reichsverfassung der Paulskirche. Vorbild und Verwirklung im späteren deutschen Rechtsleben [The Imperial Constitution of the Paulskirche. Model and realization in later German legal life] (in German) (2nd ed.). Neuwied: Luchterhand. OCLC 801154230.
