= Kuenssberg =

Kuenssberg is a surname of German origin. Notable people with the surname include:

- Ekkehard von Kuenssberg (1913–2000), Scottish physician
- Joanna Kuenssberg (born 1973), British diplomat
- Laura Kuenssberg (born 1976), British journalist

== See also ==
- Künsberg
