= Prince Karl Theodor of Bavaria =

Bavarian prince (1795–1875)

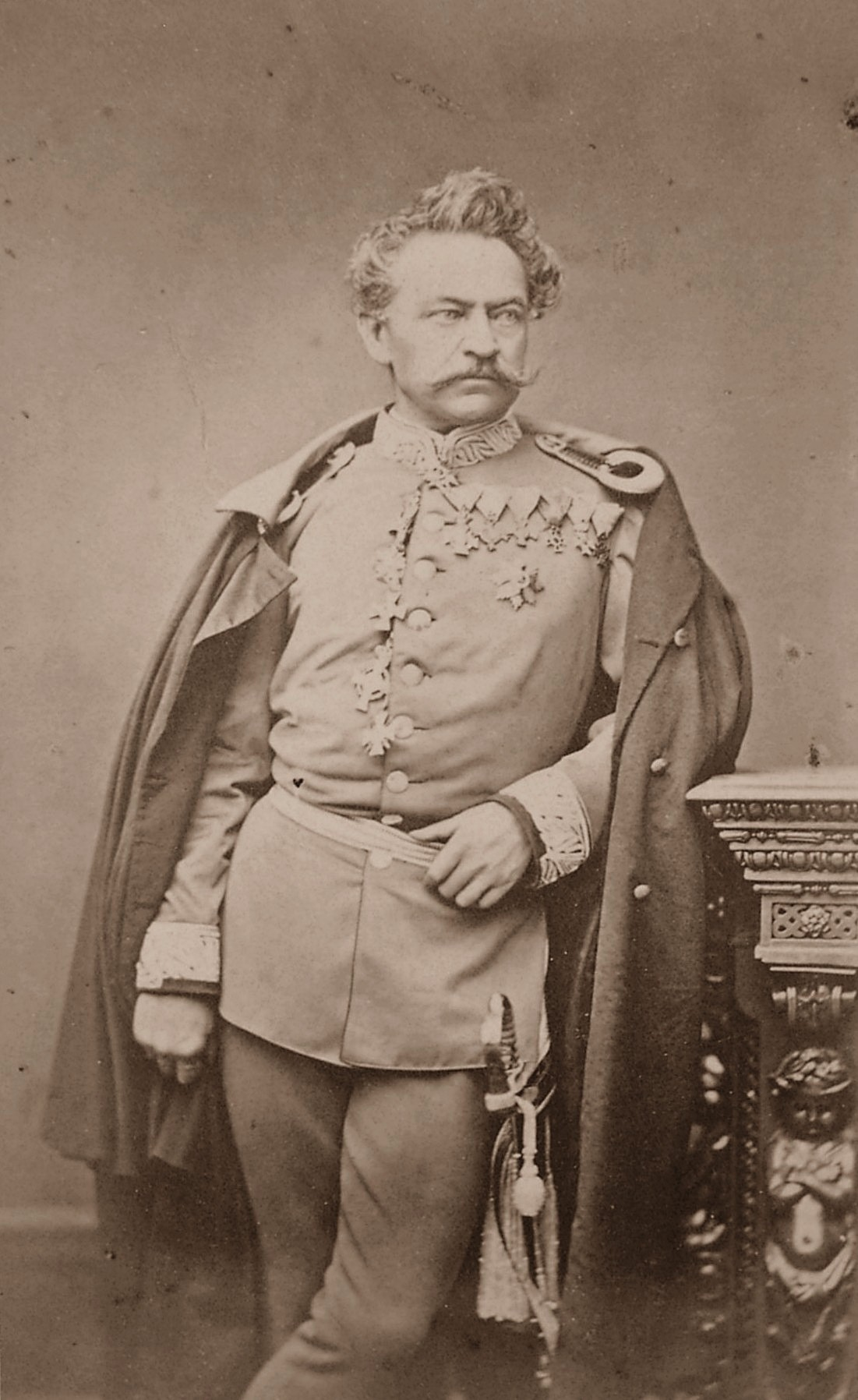
- Portrait by Josef Albert
- Born: 7 July 1795; Munich, Electorate of Bavaria, Holy Roman Empire
- Died: 16 August 1875 (aged 80); Tegernsee, Kingdom of Bavaria, German Empire
- Spouse: Marie-Anne-Sophie Petin (m. 1823; died 1838)
Names
- German: Karl Theodor Maximilian August; English: Charles Theodore Maximilian Augustus
- House: Wittelsbach
- Father: Maximilian I Joseph of Bavaria
- Mother: Augusta Wilhelmine of Hesse-Darmstadt

Prince Karl Theodor Maximilian August of Bavaria (7 July 1795 – 16 August 1875); and grand prior of the Order of Malta, was a Bavarian soldier.

== Early life ==
Charles was born in Munich on 7 July 1795. He was the second son of King Maximilian I of Bavaria and his first wife Princess Augusta Wilhelmine of Hesse-Darmstadt.

== Career ==
Charles fought against Napoleon at the Battle of Hanau in 1813, became a general of division, and took part in the Campaign of 1814. His differences with Prince Wrede led to his retirement from 1822 till some time after the latter's death in 1838, when his brother King Ludwig I of Bavaria appointed him field marshal and general inspector of the army. In the Austro-Prussian War of 1866, he was commander-in-chief of the 7th and 8th corps of the Bavarian Army, being allied with Austria. His troops, some 52,000 men, served in the Main Campaign. Afterwards he retired from public service.

== Personal life ==
On 1 October 1823, he morganatically married Marie-Anne-Sophie Petin (Neuburg, 27 July 1796 – Munich, 22 February 1838), who was created Baroness von Bayrstorff upon their marriage. She was the daughter of Franz Moritz Petin, Captain in the Bavarian Army, and Baroness Maria Theodora von Branca. Before her death at Tegernsee in 1838, they were the parents of three daughters:

- Caroline Sophie von Bayrstorff (17 October 1816 – 25 May 1889), who married Adolf, Baron von Gumppenberg (1804–1877) in 1834.
- Maximiliane Theodora von Bayrstorff (30 September 1823 – 19 March 1885), who married August, Count von Drechsel zu Deufstetten (1810–1880), in 1841.
- Franziska Sophie von Bayrstorff (10 October 1827 – 2 March 1912), who married Portuguese-Brazilian nobleman Paulo Martins de Almeida (1807–1874) in 1845.

Prince Karl fell from his horse while riding at Tegernsee in Bavaria on 16 August 1875 and was killed instantly.

=== Descendants ===
Through his eldest daughter, he was the maternal grandfather of Baroness Maximiliane von Gumppenberg (1850–1937), who married Count Maximilian von Holnstein, a close friend of King Ludwig II who brought Ludwig's "Kaiserbrief" to Otto von Bismarck.

== Honours ==
- Bavaria:
  - Knight of St. Hubert, 1810
  - Grand Prior of the Royal Bavarian House Equestrian Order of St. George, 1813
  - Knight of the Military Order of Max Joseph, 18 February 1814
  - Grand Cross of Merit of the Bavarian Crown
  - Grand Cross of the Military Merit Order
  - Army Memorial Cross (1866)
- Austria:
  - Knight of the Military Order of Maria Theresa, 1814
  - Grand Cross of St. Stephen, 1843
  - Knight of the Golden Fleece, 1859
- Baden:
  - Knight of the House Order of Fidelity, 1840
  - Grand Cross of the Zähringer Lion, 1840
- Brazil: Grand Cross of the Order of Pedro I
- (Saxe-Coburg and Gotha) (Duchy of Saxe-Altenburg) (Saxe-Meiningen) Ernestine duchies: Grand Cross of the Saxe-Ernestine House Order, June 1842
- (Tuscany) Tuscan Grand Ducal Family: Grand Cross of St. Joseph
- Hesse-Darmstadt: Grand Cross of the Ludwig Order, 21 September 1842
- (Hohenzollern-Sigmaringen) Hohenzollern: Cross of Honour of the Princely House Order of Hohenzollern, 1st Class
- Greece: Grand Cross of the Redeemer
- Netherlands: Grand Cross of the Netherlands Lion
- Prussia:
  - Knight of the Black Eagle, 10 November 1823
  - Knight of the Red Eagle, 1st Class
- Russia:
  - Knight of St. Alexander Nevsky, 16 September 1813
  - Knight of St. George, 4th Class, 29 January 1814
  - Knight of St. Andrew, 7 August 1838
  - Knight of St. Anna, 1st Class
  - Knight of the White Eagle
- Saxony:
  - Knight of the Rue Crown, 1822
  - Knight of the Military Order of St. Henry, 1870
- Sweden-Norway: Knight of the Seraphim, 16 July 1852
- Württemberg: Grand Cross of the Württemberg Crown, 1865

== Ancestry ==
Ancestors of Prince Karl Theodor of Bavaria

8. Christian III, Count Palatine of Zweibrücken
4. Frederick Michael, Count Palatine of Zweibrücken
9. Countess Caroline of Nassau-Saarbrücken
2. Maximilian I Joseph of Bavaria
10. Joseph Charles, Hereditary Prince of Sulzbach
5. Countess Palatine Maria Franziska of Sulzbach
11. Countess Palatine Elisabeth Auguste Sofie of Neuburg
1. Prince Charles of Bavaria
12. Louis VIII, Landgrave of Hesse-Darmstadt
6. Prince George William of Hesse-Darmstadt
13. Countess Charlotte of Hanau-Lichtenberg
3. Princess Augusta Wilhelmine of Hesse-Darmstadt
14. Count Christian Karl Reinhard of Leiningen-Dagsburg-Falkenburg
7. Countess Maria Louise Albertine of Leiningen-Dagsburg-Falkenburg
15. Countess Katharina Polyxena of Solms-Rödelheim
