= Ernst Rudolf Huber =

German legal historian (1903–1990)

Ernst Rudolf Huber (8 June 1903 – 28 October 1990) was a German jurist, noted as a constitutional historian and for his attempts to provide a legal underpinning for the Nazi regime.

== Life and work ==
Huber studied law in Bonn under Carl Schmitt. He received a PhD in 1926 for a work on state church law, and his habilitation in 1931 for a work on economic administrative law, which he was instrumental in establishing as a field of study. In 1933, he was called to teach in Kiel, and subsequently also taught law in Leipzig after 1937 and in Strasbourg from 1941 to 1944.

Like Georg Dahm and Karl Larenz, Huber (who joined the Nazi Party on 1 May 1933) belonged to the "Kiel school" of constitutional law, which attempted to legitimize the Führerstaat, Adolf Hitler's dictatorship, by constructing a legal structure to anchor it in the German state as the source of all legitimate power. In doing so, Huber was influential in shaping the law of Nazi Germany and in recruiting others to that task. Because of this, he was excluded from the public law scholars' association in 1956, and did not find work as an ordinary professor until 1962, when he was appointed to a chair in Göttingen.

After the end of the 1930s, Huber's work focused on the history of German constitutional law. This culminated in his Deutsche Verfassungsgeschichte seit 1789, which covered mainly Prussian constitutional law from 1789 to 1933, and was published in eight volumes between 1957 and 1990.
