= Künsberg =

Family name and lineage

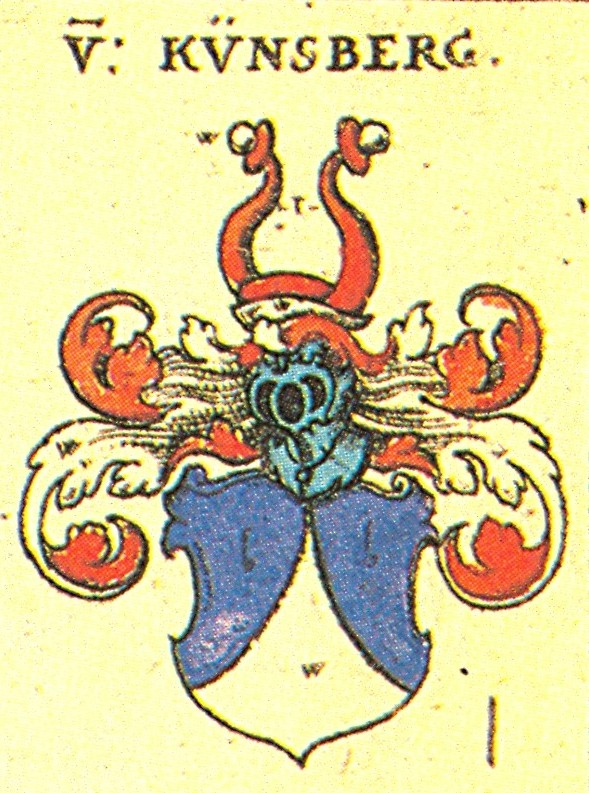
Coat of arms in Siebmachers Wappenbuch

The Künsberg family was an old German noble family of knights from the Franconian Forest and Upper Franconia.

== History ==
The Künsberg family took its name from Künsberg near Creußen and was directly related to the House of Sparneck. Members of the family held the title of Baron, granted to them in 1690.

== Notable members ==
- Antonietta Cornelia von Künsberg (1812-1862), Bavarian beauty appeared in the Gallery of Beauties gathered by Ludwig I of Bavaria
- Caroline von Künsberg (1815-1859), Bavarian beauty appeared in the Gallery of Beauties gathered by Ludwig I of Bavaria
- Eberhard von Künßberg (1881–1941), legal historian
- Eberhard von Künsberg (1909–1945), Nazi diplomat

== See also ==
- Kuenssberg
- Burgstall Altenkünsberg, derelict castle
