= Holnstein =

Coordinates: 49.5564°N 11.6455°E

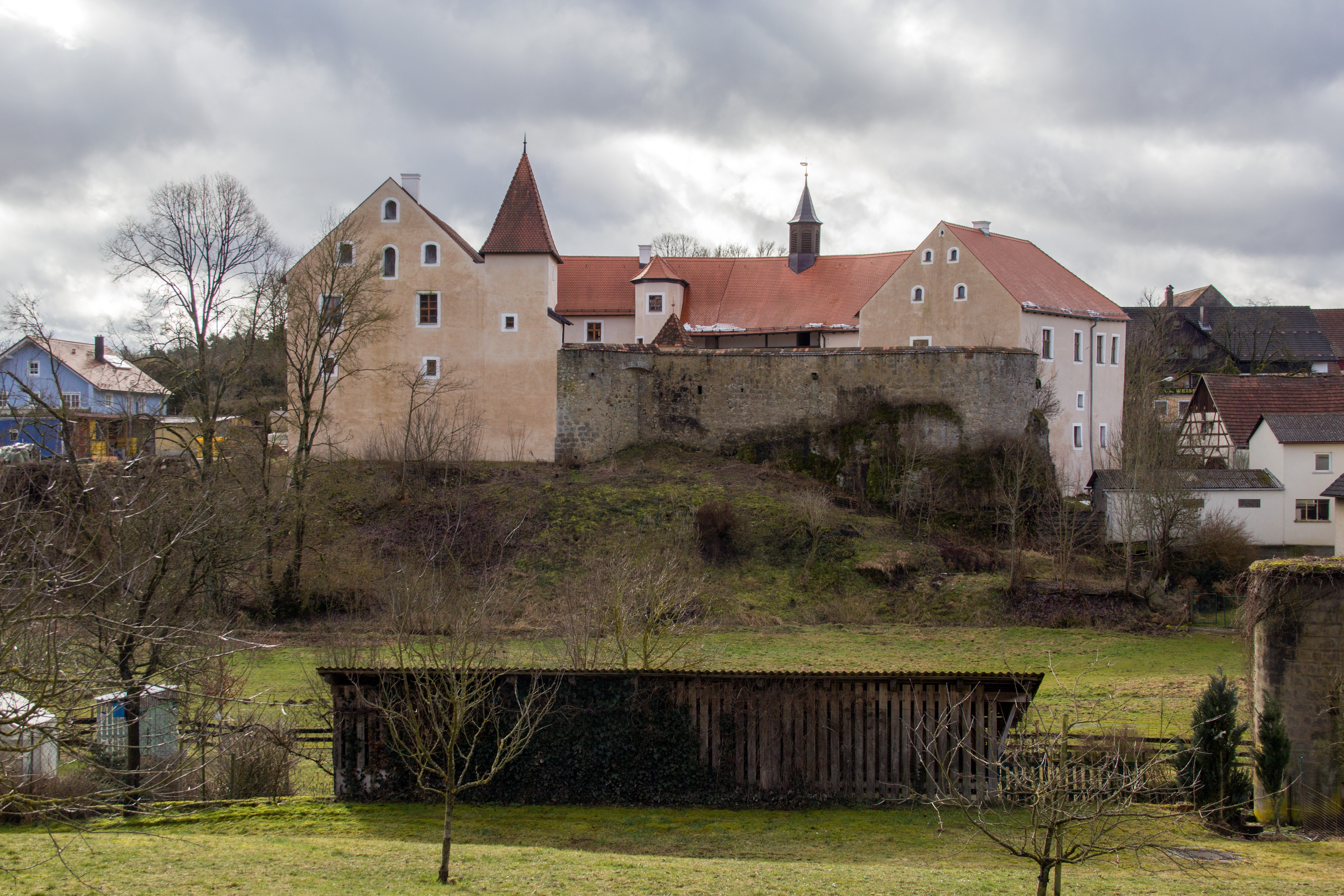
Schloss Holnstein, 2016

Holnstein (German pronunciation: [ˈhɔlnʃtaɪn]) is part of the municipality of Neukirchen bei Sulzbach-Rosenberg. It is located in Bavaria, Germany.

== History ==
Most important sight is the castle of Holnstein (Schloss Holnstein), and the brewery that is located since 1502 inside the castle. The castle was home to the Count of Holnstein.

An important event is the "Kirwa" which takes place every year on the first weekend of August. All of the village celebrates the patron of its chapelle, St. Katharina.

== See also ==
- Caroline von Holnstein
