= Kaiserbrief =

1870 letter to German Federal princes

The Kaiserbrief (English: Imperial Letter), is the letter to the German Federal princes signed by North German Chancellor Otto von Bismarck on 27 November 1870 and Bavarian King Ludwig II (born 1845, reign 1864–1886) on 30 November 1870. Ludwig's uncle, Prince Luitpold of Bavaria, the later Prince Regent (1886–1912), on 3 December 1870 personally handed over the Imperial Letter to the Prussian king.

Ludwig II gave the impetus to the emperor's proclamation of William I in the Hall of Mirrors at Versailles with this letter, which the Prussian King William I proposed to the imperial dignity of the newly founded German Empire, where, during the Siege of Paris during the Franco-Prussian War, representatives of the free cities congregated on 18 January 1871.

An excerpt of the Imperial Letter:

After the acceptance of Southern Germany to the German Constitutional Alliance, Your Majesty will extend presidential rights across the German states. I have agreed, in their conviction, that this would satisfy the interests of the German fatherland and its allied princes, but at the same time, trust that the rights conferred on the Federal Presidium by the restoration of a German Empire and of the German Emperor's dignity as rights which Your Majesty may exercise in the name of the entire German fatherland, on account of the unification of its princes. I have, therefore, appealed to the German princes, with the suggestion that they should bring with me to Your Majesty the suggestion that the exercise of the presidential rights of the Confederation be connected with the title of German Emperor.

— Haus der Bayerischen Geschichte

== Instigation of the letter ==
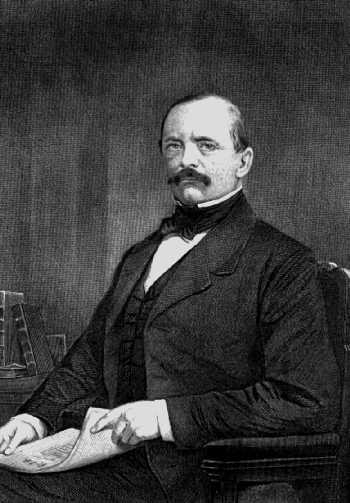
Otto von Bismarck, 1873

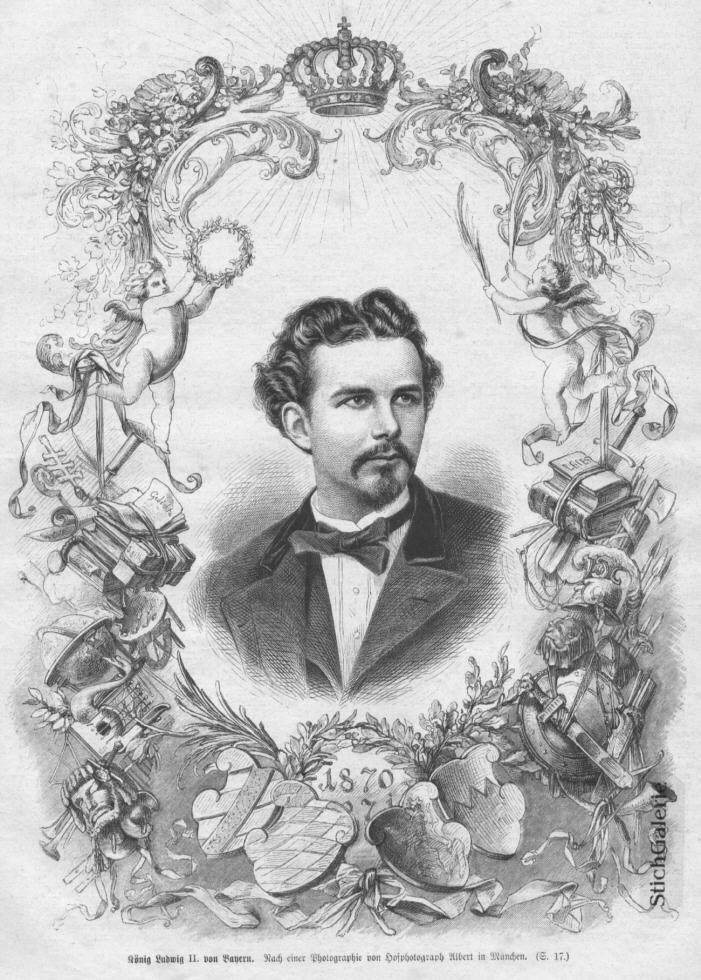
Ludwig II, 1870

Even though the historical circumstance which led to this letter have now largely been clarified, their interpretation is still controversial. This document, which is important for the founding of the German Empire, could well be regarded as the result of a state of doubtful behaviour, and thus perhaps even a form of corruption.

=== William's hesitation ===
William I took the new office of German Emperor only hesitantly, since he saw himself as the Prussian King. On the one hand, the southern German princes were not necessarily willing to accept Wilhelm's desire to call himself "Emperor of Germany", since they did not want to recognise a new sovereign. Finally, it was both William's and Bismarck's concerns to make the act of conferring and establishing the new dignity appear as one of the German princes and not the parliaments. It was still clear that 22 years previously in 1848, William's brother and predecessor, Frederick William IV, had rejected the emperor's deputation, which he had ordered the emperor's crown for a Lesser German Empire on the order of the Frankfurt National Assembly with the "free consent of the crowned heads, the princes and the free cities of Germany", since he was not born emperor. Bismarck, therefore, could only gain William's approval if the German princes and free cities asked him to accept the imperial crown, "the old, legitimate crown of the German nation, which had been laid down since 1806", as William described it elsewhere. This could only be done by the Bavarian King, since, according to the King of Prussia, he was regarded as the highest ranking of the princes of the small German nation.

=== Ludwig's opposition to Prussia ===
Ludwig II, who had been in office since 1864, was, however, a supporter of the Greater German solution, a German agreement including Austria, and thus also under the leadership of the Austrian Emperor, and above all under the full protection of Bavarian sovereignty. He had not wounded the defeat of the Austro-Prussian War of 1866, in which Bavaria, together with Saxony, Baden, Württemberg, Hanover, Hesse-Darmstadt, Electoral Hesse and Nassau, had stood as an ally to Austria. Bavaria had to pay Prussia 30 million guilders as compensation and subordinate its army to Prussia's command in the event of war.

Under this command, with the enthusiastic consent of the population, 55,000 Bavarian soldiers, led by Prussian Prince Frederick William, were drawn into the war against France in 1870. Ludwig had refused to take the lead. He was also absent from the victory celebrations at Versailles and had rejected the request of his own government and on the orders of Bismarck, to make the Prussian King a German Emperor. His government, however, had already announced its acceptance to the German Empire without his consent, while Ludwig still complained about France's loss in the war.

=== Ludwig's notorious financial problems ===
From the outset, Ludwig was less interested in governmental affairs than in a particular representative depiction of his kingship in culture and architecture. This had a tradition in his family, his great-grandfather Maximilian I and grandfather Ludwig I had already used large parts of the state budget to the representative development of Munich as residence, but also to the promotion of art, education and science. Ludwig's Schlösser burdened his private finances to the utmost. Prince Eulenberg-Hertefeld, secretary of the Prussian ambassador in Munich, described how the king had shattered state finances, and privately tried to get money from all sides, like a loan of twenty million florins from the prince of Thurn and Taxis. He had also begged the Austrian Emperor, the kings of Belgium and Sweden to ask the (Turkish) Sultan and the Shah of Persia for money.

== Agreements of the Imperial Letter ==
=== Telegram from Count Werthern ===
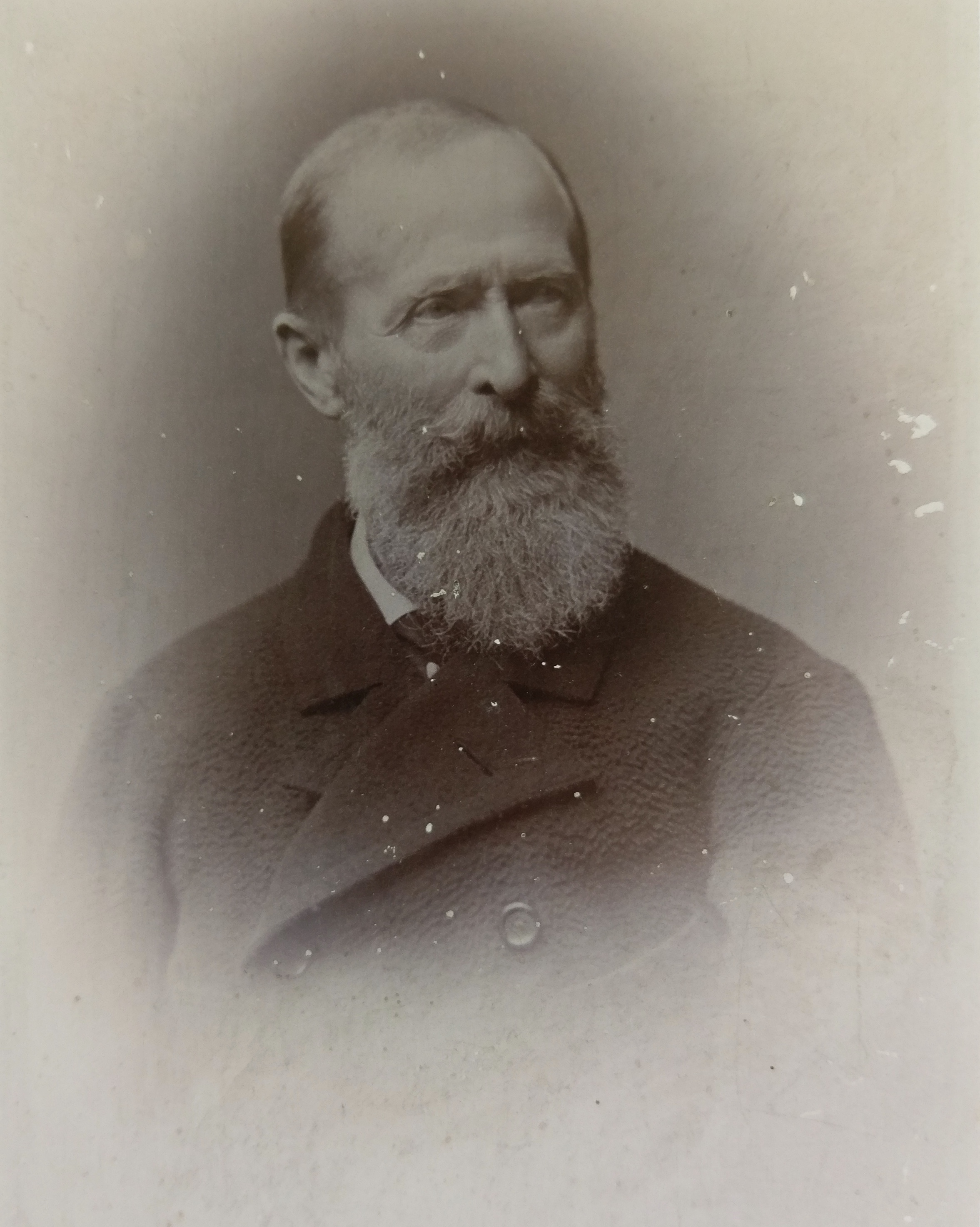
Count Georg von Werthern

The tense financial situation, especially of his private fortune, was known to Bismarck and his own Bavarian ministers to induce Ludwig to make a decision, the Prussian ambassador, Count Georg von Werthern, on 19 November 1870, to Bismarck in the following words:

Top Secret. The King of Bavaria has been greatly pressed for money by buildings and theatres. Six million guilders would be very agreeable to him, provided the ministers did not know. For this sum, he would also make up his mind on the Imperial Proclamation and voyage to Versailles. The purpose of Count Holnstein's journey is to speak with Your Excellency.

— Franz Herre

As early as 20 November 1870, Bismarck telegraphed to the head of the Federal Chancellery in Berlin, Delbrück: "I hope to come to a conclusion with Bavaria. If it does so, it seems unquestionable that the question of the Emperor is to be brought from there".

=== Unity with Bavaria and King Ludwig ===
On 23 November 1870, Bismarck had reached an agreement with the representative of the Bavarian Government on their acceptance to the German Empire. Bismarck made major concessions to Bavaria (its own post and telecommunication systems, its own railways and its own army during peace time). He returned from the negotiations that "Now the Bavarian agreement has been finished and signed. German unity has been made and the emperor also". His employees signed the agreement with two empty bottles of champagne next to it.

Oberst-Stallmeister Count Holnstein, Ludwig's confidant and personal communicator, arrived in Versailles two days later on 25 November 1870, where he was immediately received by Bismarck, without first communicating with the Bavarian negotiation delegation. Nothing is known about the course of the conversation, only the result of an agreement between the parties. On 26 November 1870, Bismarck announced this, albeit in a somewhat alienated form, to his co-workers, when, in a confidential memorandum, which he had sent to the head of the Staatskanzlei Delbrück on contract negotiations with the Bavarian government representatives on 23 November 1870, notes that "Following my letter today, I still keep in confidence that I have also discussed the imperial question with the Bavarian Ministers and have stated their willingness to initiate the same by stimulating Bavaria. According to their suggestions, I suppose that a letter from His Majesty the King of Bavaria to His Majesty the King in which the motion is made and is already underway". In fact, he had only recently agreed with Ludwig's representative about his demands and on 27 November 1870, he formulate the supposedly awaited letter, the later imperial letter, with caution. He had refrained from his original demand that Ludwig should come to Versailles in person. He gave the draft of the emperor's letter, together with a personal letter to Ludwig, which he began with exuberant thanksgiving. "Most Gracious, Most Highly King! For the gracious opening which Count Holnstein had made to Your Majesty, I would like to congratulate you on the most honourable expression of my thanks." He then read the imperial letter.

Concerning the German imperial question, it is important, in my opinion, that their suggestion should not proceed from any other side, such as Your Majesty, and especially from popular representation. The position would be falsified if it did not derive its origin from the free and well-to-do initiative of the mightiest of princes who joined the alliance. I have allowed Holnstein to surrender, at his request, the draft of a declaration to my most gracious King, and with the necessary changes of the version to the other allies.

— Otto von Bismarck

Together with the Bavarian state ministers, who had represented Bavaria at the conclusion of the Bavarian acceptance treaty, Holnstein returned to Munich on the train and brought them to Bismarck's draft. On 30 November 1870, Holnstein arrived at the Hohenschwangau Castle, where Ludwig was staying and was received by the King when he was informed that he had to return to Versailles at 6 pm. He then told the King that he would go back to Versailles, either with or without result, but it was to be expected that the troops in front of Paris would exclaim William I as Emperor. With minor modifications, Ludwig wrote up Bismarck's draft and handed it to Holstein, who brought him to Munich for sealing. In an accompanying letter, Ludwig asked his secretary of the Cabinet to review the letter and, if a different letter seemed to be more appropriate to him, "the matter is being crushed, and I authorise you to tear the letter to the King of Prussia". The Secretary of the Cabinet, on the other hand, sealed the letter on 1 December, and Holnstein returned to Versailles the following day, where he received the letter from Ludwig's uncle, Prince Luitpold of Bavaria (1886–1912) who took over the role of Prince Regent after Ludwig was incapacitated.

On 3 December 1870, Bismarck jubilated in a telegram to Count Werthern, the Prussian ambassador in Munich:

Tell Count Bray, His Majesty the King, has received the letter from his Majesty King Ludwig with great thanks from the hands of his Royal Highness Prince Luitpold on 30 November, and thanked King Ludwig for his new patriotic attitude towards His Majesty. The difficulties on account of the Treaties, which I am hoping for, will be over come.

— Otto von Bismarck

=== Count of Holnstein ===
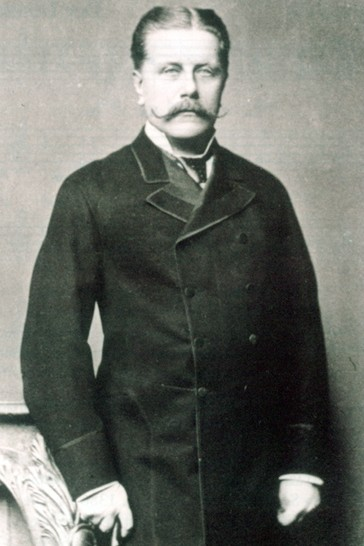
Count Maximilian von Holnstein

Count Maximilian von Holnstein (born 19 October 1835) knew Ludwig from his childhood. He was pardoned in 1866 by Ludwig from a fortress, which he had served for the sake of a reverend, and appointed him as the Royal Bavarian Oberstallmeister. He came from the House of Wittelsbach and held the royal domination of Schwarzenfeld, Rauberweiherhaus, Thanstein and Pillmersried in the Upper Palatinate. He enjoyed Ludwig's fullest confidence, which he lost only three years before his death because of his resistance to the King wasting money. He had acted as a guardian of Ludwig's incarceration. After Ludwig died, he remained as Oberststallmeister to Prince Regent Luitpold until 1892, and then retired to his castle in Schwarzfeld, where he died in 1895.

Holnstein was also economically successful and belong to the co-founders of the Bayerische Vereinsbank. He played a central role in the settlement of the agreements with Bismarck. The details of the processing of payments made were fixed with him and he received 10% of the money, which headed back to Ludwig for his services. Bismarck acknowledged his merits for German unification. "The Count of Holnstein has made a considerable contribution to the formal conclusion of our national agreement by eliminating the external obstacles of the German National Assembly by making two trips in a week without sleep and by the clever execution of his commission in Hohenschwangau." Bismarck recommended to Count Werthern, the Prussian ambassador in Munich, on 24 December 1870, in connection with the ratification of the Bavarian acceptance treaties by the Bavarian parliament, which appeared to be uncertain, to discuss the position of the King on this question "also with Count Holnstein, who is best informed of the King's intentions and views." Holnstein's influence on Ludwig must have been striking. In 1882, Prince Eulenberg-Hertefeld reported the remark that "Holnstein must know some strange thing about the King and use it as weapon – the King no longer loves him, and he obeys him."

== Settlement of payments to Ludwig ==
The information on the amount of payments made by Prussia to Ludwig fluctuated. This also pointed out that the German Empire in 1876 unified the currency and in Prussia converted Guilders into Goldmarks. Overall, Ludwig appeared to have received more than six million gold marks. In addition to a first large advance payment, the guarantee was to be given to him later, only after the first year's payments. The current payments began in 1873, initially 300,000 gold marks, which should have increased by the end of 1885. In 1884, Ludwig also received a special payment of more than one million gold marks. The payments were handled secretly by Swiss banks and flowed into Ludwig's private assets.

Since neither Emperor William nor Parliament could know of the agreement, Bismarck deducted the amounts of Welfs funds confiscated after the Prussian victory in the Austro-Prussian War of 1866 which corresponded to the King's House of Hanover, estimated at 42 million guilders, identical of which to the English and Hanoverian throne. The property was considered to be confiscated until England would recognise the annexation of Hanover by Prussia. During this time, the revenues of Prussia flowed. Bismarck regarded the Welfs' funds as being outside of parliamentary control and used his income as a slush fund. It was not until 1892 that Emperor William II ordered the proceeds of the Welfs' funds to be given to the head of the former head of the Royal House of Hanover. Only after Ludwig's death and Bismarck's resignation as Chancellor in 1890 were the payments announced. Bismarck declared it a loan granted to the King of Bavaria, of which he had never accepted that it was to be repaid.

== Different assessments of Ludwig's behaviour ==
Since the payments and their circumstances had become known, it was disputed whether a bribery had been sent to the Imperial Letter and thus to a symbolically important act with regard to the founding of the Empire, whether it was a dossier to a swaying sovereign, or whether the payments were the work of bribes. Ludwig's behaviour was defended by the fact that it would correspond to political habits, to negotiate with the task of sovereignty or its restriction also over money payments, how often payments in the form of appanages or other donations to sovereigns were also agreed. Ludwig had certainly been seduced by his advisers. Finally, a few years earlier, Prussia had to pay 30 million guilders as reparations. Ludwig's admirers also pointed out that their King would have been able to change his mind on money at all. On the other hand, the Bavarian government had already declared itself ready to join the German Empire at the time of the telegram sent by Count Werthern and could not have succeeded in carrying out its repayment of reparations. Moreover, it was clear to everyone that the private assets of the monarch were separate from the state's assets. On his accession to the throne, Ludwig II had expressed himself openly and with joy to the constitution, which refused to grant him former absolute rights to the power of the state, although he soon dreamed of a strengthening royal power.

In any case, the King could no longer dispose of state revenues by virtue of a constitution. The secret and disguised handling of money payments were proof that Ludwig had been aware of this. Bismarck was only able to fulfil his guaranteed money payments on the basis of the fact that larger withdrawals from the Welfs' fund would not have been noticeable, but would also have attacked his stock, which would have contradicted the conditions of seizure. At any rate, Bismarck had also been concerned about the embarrassing secrecy. From the very beginning, he had admitted to the hiding-place, even before the Bavarian government. This was also confirmed by his official announcement of 26 November 1870 on Ludwig's change of meaning – after he had secretly agreed with Holnstein – to the head of the Federal Chancellery, Delbrück. (The Bavarian ministers had already pointed out a letter from Ludwig, which had already been sent to Versailles). All parties were aware of the interests of the Bavarian state on the other hand, and the private interests of the monarch.

== Ambiguous assets ==
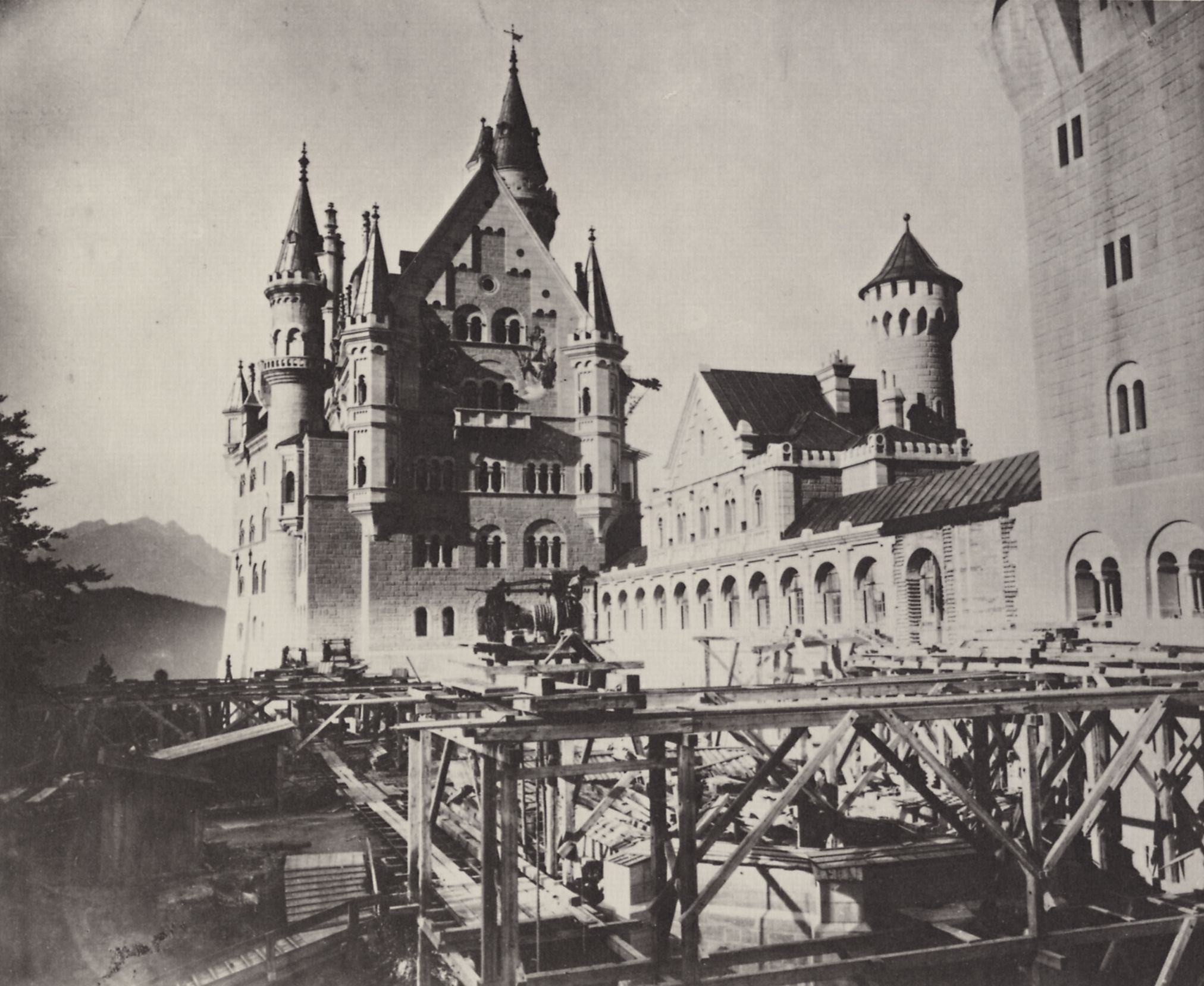
Neuschwanstein as a building site, 1886

Thus, there is a great deal of evidence for the interpretation that King Ludwig, outside the Bavarian state budget, had demanded and paid for third-party remuneration for a statutory act, that is, an official act, into his private assets, which according to modern terminology would be corruption. However, it has to be considered that the debate on the accession of Bavaria to the nation of Germany was discussed between 19 November (Telegram sent by Werthern) and 3 December 1870 (sending of the Imperial Letter by Prince Luitpold), including the reserve rights and personal involvement of Ludwig in clarifying the imperial question. For Ludwig, these were related questions, in which he would hardly have distinguished between his person and the state.

Ludwig also had to be held to the effect that from his point of view, the separation of state power from royal private wealth was by no means self-evident. At the end of the monarchy of 1918, this question was still to be highly disputed among lawyers and led to the Bavarian law on the Wittelsbach Equalisation Fund. For, at the beginning of the 19th century, to which Ludwig had also descended, had transferred his property to the distressed state (also in accordance with the Bavarian constitution of 1818), and the state had taken over the supply of Wittelsbach. After 1918, jurists of the former royal house argued that in Bavaria a separation between state property and the house wealth of the Wittelsbachs had not yet been carried out. The resulting compromise led to the founding of the Wittelsbach compensation fund, which included the former Wittelsbach property (including the castles of Berg and Hohenschwangau, but not the castles belonging to King Ludwig II, which were retained under state ownership) and whose income since then has been sustained by members of the former Royal family.

From the present point of view, no harm was caused to the state as means of Ludwig's conduct. The six million gold marks which had been sent to him as a whole, was demonstrably used to settle construction calculations, for example, the Herrenchiemsee Castle, corresponded approximately to the value of the actual expenses for Neuschwanstein Castle, the most famous of King Ludwig's castles. In 2006 alone, it was visited by over one million people. Even the annual income from this castle for the free state exceeds the sum in question.

== See also ==
- November Treaties
- German Emperor
- Founding of the German Empire
