= Schwarzenfeld =

- Municipality
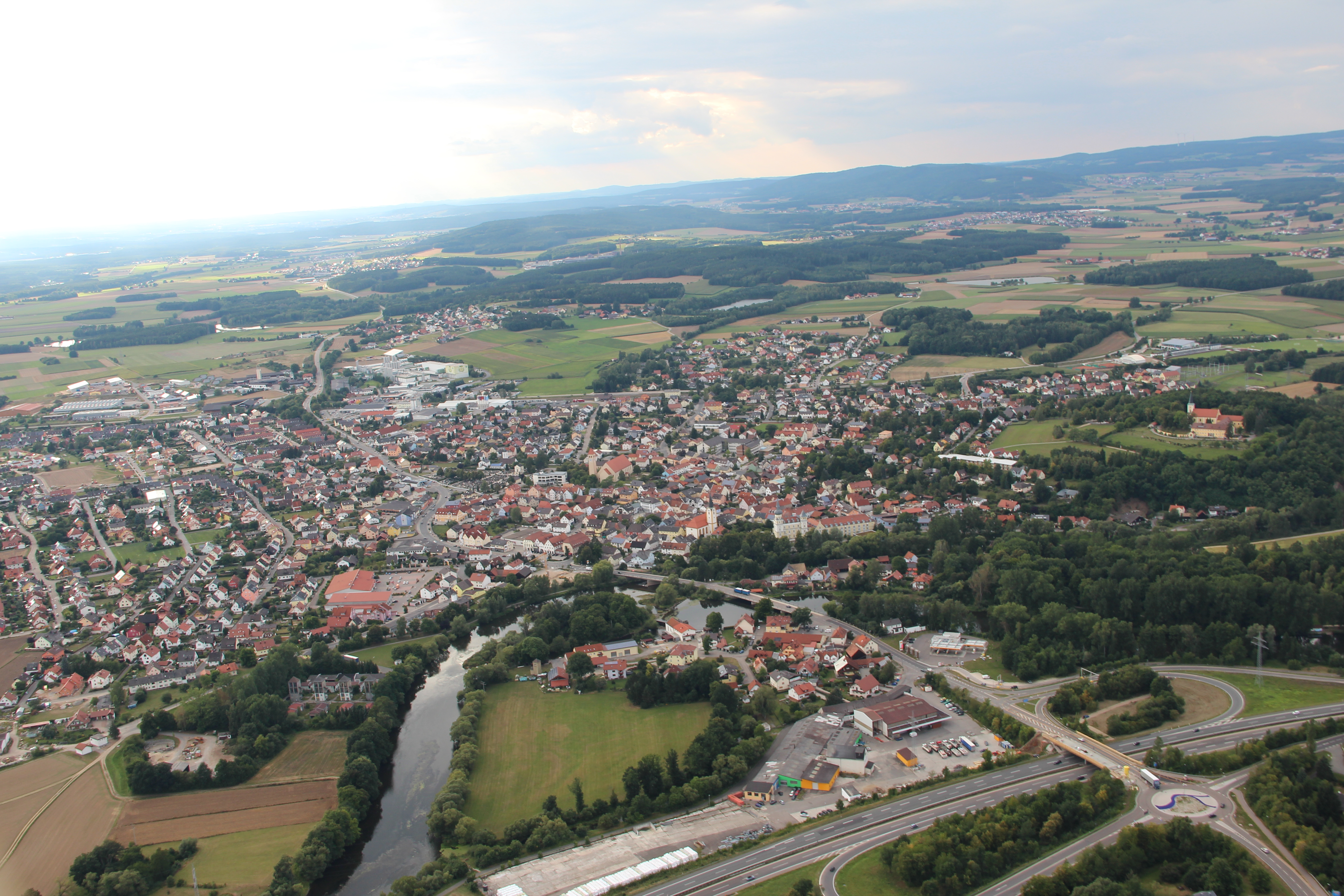
- Aerial view of the town

- Coat of arms

- Location of Schwarzenfeld within Schwandorf district
- Interactive map of Schwarzenfeld
- Location within Germany Location within Bavaria
- Coordinates: 49°23′N 12°8′E
- Country: Germany
- State: Bavaria
- Admin. region: Oberpfalz
- District: Schwandorf
- Municipal assoc.: Schwarzenfeld

Government
  - Mayor (2020–26): Peter Neumeier (FW)

Area
  - Total: 38.27 km^{2} (14.78 sq mi)
- Elevation: 360–415 m (1,181–1,362 ft)

Population (2025-12-31)
  - Total: 6,262
  - Density: 163.6/km^{2} (423.8/sq mi)
- Time zone: UTC+01:00 (CET)
  - Summer (DST): UTC+02:00 (CEST)
- Postal codes: 92521
- Dialling codes: 0 94 35
- Vehicle registration: SAD, BUL, NAB, NEN, OVI, ROD
- Website: www.schwarzenfeld.de

Schwarzenfeld (German pronunciation: [ˈʃvaʁtsn̩ˌfɛlt]) is a municipality in the district of Schwandorf in Bavaria, Germany. Schwarzenfeld was first mentioned as “Suarzinvelt” on April 17, 1015 in a deed of gift from Emperor Henry II to the diocese of Bamberg. In 1890 Schwarzenfeld was elevated to market status.

The melodic death metal band Deadlock is based in this municipality.

== Climate ==
Schwarzenfeld

Climate chart (precipitation, max. and min. temperature)
J	F	M	A	M	J	J	A	S	O	N	D
107 −5 −8	60 0 −7	31 7 −3	56 16 4	124 21 9	106 23 13	96 25 15	119 24 13	85 18 9	84 12 3	74 3 1	95 −4 −8
- █ Average max. and min. temperatures in °C
- █ Precipitation totals in mm
Imperial conversion
J	F	M	A	M	J	J	A	S	O	N	D
4.2 23 18	2.4 32 19	1.2 45 27	2.2 61 39	4.9 70 48	4.2 73 55	3.8 77 59	4.7 75 55	3.3 64 48	3.3 54 37	2.9 37 34	3.7 25 18
- █ Average max. and min. temperatures in °F
- █ Precipitation totals in inches

== Notable buildings ==
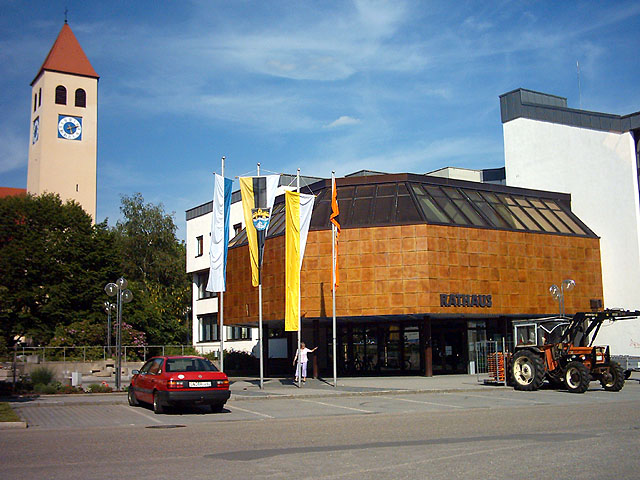
Church of the Virgin Mary and Town Hall in Schwarzenfeld
