= Schloss Fronberg =

Castle in Bavaria

Coordinates: 49°20′39.4″N 12°07′24.4″E

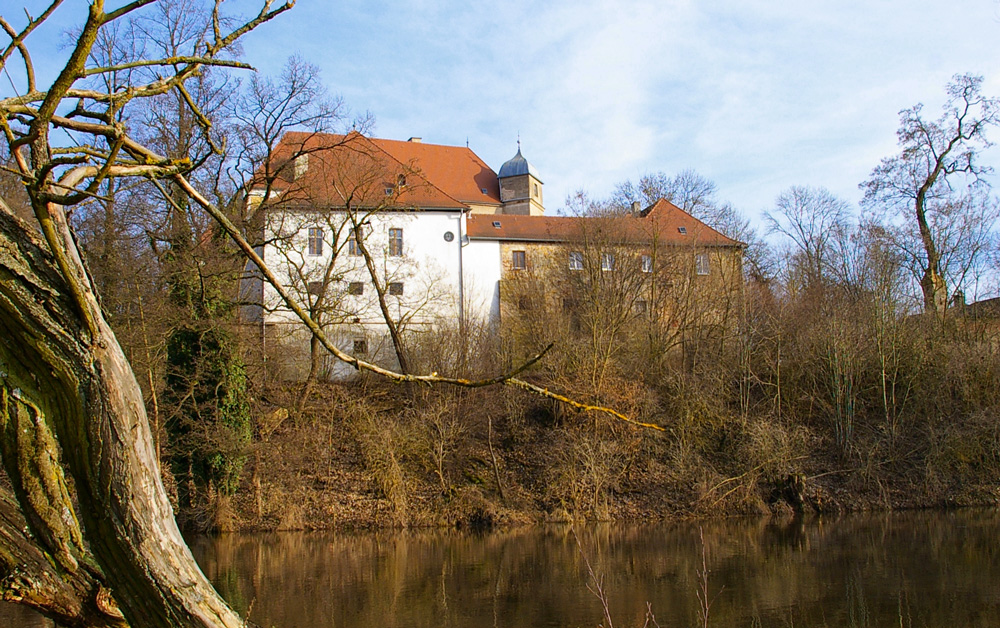
Schloss Fronberg

Schloss Fronberg is a castle in Schwandorf in Bavaria.

== History ==
Fronberg The estate was constructed in 1305. The lords of the castle and bailiffs of Mappenberg rebuilt it after a fire. It partly burned again in 1594. In 1622-1829 the castle and its lands belonged to the barons von Spiering, then Countess von Holnstein, born Baroness von Spiering.

The Countess lived with her lover, Baron von Kunsberg, whom she married before dying. She is one of the women whose portrait appears in the gallery of beauties from Nymphenburg Castle, commissioned by King Ludwig I of Bavaria. The castle then passed to his descendants, the Kunsberg von Fronberg barons. It was acquired in 1875 by Baron von Breidbach-Bürresheim, whose descendants continue to reside in the castle.

The castle was restored in 1992. The family regularly organizes concerts, medieval shows and plays for the public.

== Owners ==
- middle of the 15th. century Fronberger
- 1464 to mid-16th. century Pollinger
- 1507 Christoph von Plankenfels
- 1514 Hans Mistelbeck
- 1521-1586 the Vestenberger
- 1587 Christoph Heinrich von Zedtwitz
- 1601-1622 Hans Wilhelm von Guttenberg
- 1622-1829 von Spiering and Caroline von Holnstein-Spiering

== Architecture ==
Little is left of the medieval castle that was rebuilt in the Renaissance and refurbished in the nineteenth century . The Renaissance arcades found in the courtyard have some historical value. The castle consists of three buildings
