= Huber =

Huber is a German-language surname. It derives from the German word Hube meaning hide, a unit of land a farmer might possess, granting them the status of a free tenant. It is in the top ten most common surnames in the German-speaking world, especially in Austria and Switzerland, where it is the surname of approximately 0.3% of the population.

Variants arising from varying dialectal pronunciation of the surname include Hueber, Hüber, Huemer, Humor, Haumer, Huebner and (anglicized) Hoover.

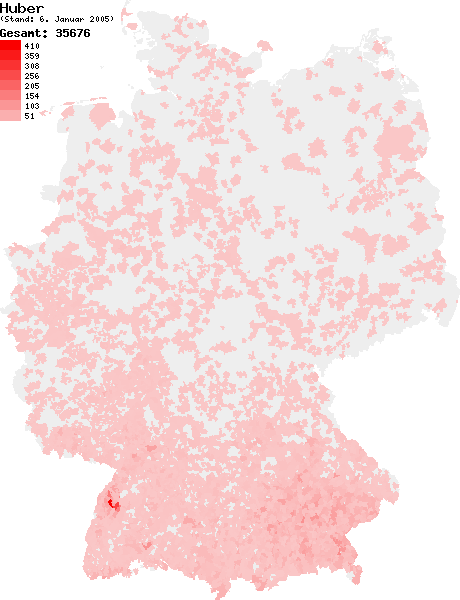
Map showing frequency distribution of the surname Huber in Germany. A clear increase in frequency is seen as one moves south towards the Austrian border.

== People with the surname Huber ==
=== A ===
- Adam Huber, (born 1987), American actor
- Adam Huber of Riesenpach (1545–1613), Czech doctor and writer of medical books
- Ahmed Huber (1927–2008), Swiss-German journalist and convert to Islam
- Alexander Huber (disambiguation), multiple people
- Alfons Huber (1834–1898), Austrian historian
- Alfred Huber, multiple people
- Alois Huber, multiple people
- Alyson Huber (born 1972), Californian legislator elected to the State Assembly in 2008
- Andrea Huber (born 1975), Swiss cross-country skier
- Andrin Huber (born 2004), Swiss multi-event athlete
- Anja Huber (born 1983), German skeleton racer
- Anke Huber (born 1974), German tennis player
- Anna Huber, Austrian fashion model
- Anthony Huber (born 1994), killed in the Kenosha unrest shooting
- Antje Huber (1924-2015), German politician
- Arnold Huber (born 1967), Italian luger

=== B ===
- Berni Huber (born 1967), German alpine skier
- Berthold Huber (born 1950), German trade union leader
- Bettina Huber (born 1995), Liechtensteiner footballer
- Blanche Huber (died 1940), Maltese female doctor
- Bruno Huber (1930–1999), Swiss astrologer, husband of Louise Huber

=== C ===
- Cheri Huber (born c. 1944), American independent Soto Zen teacher
- Charles Huber, multiple people
- Christoph Huber, Swiss-born surgeon
- Clarence Huber (1895–1965), American third baseman
- Clarisa Huber (born 1984), Argentinian footballer
- Cora Huber (born 1981), Swiss bobsledder

=== D ===
- Daniel Huber (1768-1829), Swiss mathematician and astronomer
- Daniel Huber (born 1993), Austrian ski jumper
- David Huber, multiple people
- Don Huber (born 1957), American soccer (football) forward

=== E ===
- Edward Huber (1837–1904), American inventor and industrialist
- Egon Huber (1905-1960), Austrian artist
- Elisabeth Huber-Sannwald, Austrian researcher specializing in ecosystem ecology
- Ella Huber (born 2002), American ice hockey player
- Ernst Huber, multiple people
- Erwin Huber (born 1946), German conservative politician
- Eugen Huber (1849-1923), Swiss jurist
- Evelyne Huber, American and Swiss political scientist

=== F ===
- François Huber (1750–1831), Swiss naturalist
- Franz Huber, Austrian luger
- Franz Josef Huber (1902–1975), former SS general
- Fred Huber (died 1995), American ice hockey executive
- Fritz Huber, multiple people

=== G ===
- Gaby Huber (born 1980), Swiss squash player
- George W. Huber, American chemical engineer
- Georges Huber (1910–2003), Swiss journalist
- Gerardo Huber (c. 1945–1992), Chilean Army colonel
- Gerhard Huber (born 1934), Austrian gymnast
- Gerold Huber (born 1969), German pianist
- Ginger Huber (born 1974), American diver
- Gregory Huber (born 1956), American lawyer and Wisconsin Circuit Court Judge
- Grischa Huber (1944–2021), German theatre and film actress
- Günther Huber (born 1965), Italian bobsledder and luger
- Gusti Huber (1914–1993), Austrian-American actress

=== H ===
- Hans Huber, multiple people
- Harold Huber (1909–1959), American character actor of the 1930s/1940s
- Henry Huber (1869–1933), American lawyer and progressive Republican politician
- Herbert Huber, multiple people
- Hermann J. Huber (1954–2009), German writer and journalist
- Herta Huber (1926–2018), German writer and poet

=== I ===
- Irmgard Huber (1901–1974), German head nurse
- Isabell Huber (born 1987), German politician

=== J ===
- John Huber (1986-2010) Brazilian museum actor
- Jacques Huber (1867–1914), Swiss-Brazilian botanist
- Jan Huber (born 2005), Swiss cyclist
- Jean Huber (1721–1786), Genevan painter
- Jeffrey Huber (born 1959), Dutch taekwondo practitioner
- Jessica Huber (born 1970), American speech scientist
- Joan Huber (1925–2026), American sociologist and academic
- Johann Huber (disambiguation)
- Johannes Huber (born 1987), German politician
- John Huber (disambiguation)
- JoKarl Huber (1902–1996), German artist
- Jon Huber (disambiguation)
- Joseph Huber, multiple people
- Juan Huber (1937–2010), Argentine rower
- Julie Huber, scientist
- Julius H. Huber (1852–1939), American architect
- Jürgen Huber (born 1974), Austrian economist
- Justin Huber (born 1982), Australian baseball player

=== K ===
- Karl Huber, multiple people
- Katharina Huber (born 1995), Austrian alpine skier
- Kevin Huber (born 1985), American football punter
- Klaus Huber (1924–2017), Swiss composer and academic teacher
- Konrad Huber (1892–1960), Finnish sport shooter
- Kristian Huber (born 1997), Austrian bobsledder
- Kurt Huber (1893–1943), German university professor and resistance fighter
- Kurt Huber (born 1937), Swiss tenor

=== L ===
- Larry Huber (born 1950), American television producer, writer, and animator
- Lee Huber (1919–2005), American basketball player
- Liezel Huber (born 1976), South African tennis player
- Liza Huber (born 1975), American television actress
- Lorenz Huber (1906–1989), German footballer
- Lothar Huber (born 1952), German football coach and former player
- Lotti Huber (1912–1998), German actress
- Louise Huber (1930–1999), Swiss astrologer, wife of Bruno Huber
- Ludwig Huber, multiple people

=== M ===
- Marcel Huber (1927–2014), Swiss racing cyclist
- Marcia Huber, American chemical engineer
- Marie Huber (1695–1753), Genevan writer and theologian
- Marion Huber (born 1930), Chilean sprinter
- Martin Huber (born 1977), German politician (CSU)
- Max Huber (disambiguation), several people
- Michael Huber (disambiguation), several people

=== N ===
- Nicolas Huber (born 1995), Swiss snowboarder
- Nicolaus A. Huber (born 1939), German composer
- Norbert Huber (born 1964), Italian luger

=== O ===
- Oscar E. Huber (1917–2017), American politician, rancher, and farmer
- Ossi Huber (1954–2025), Austrian musician and author
- Otto Huber (1914–1989), American baseball player
- Otto Huber (born 1944), Italian ecologist

=== P ===
- Patrick Huber, German theoretical particle physicist
- Paul Huber, multiple people
- Peter Huber, multiple people
- Petra Huber (born 1966), Austrian former tennis player
- Philipp Huber (born 1974), Swiss decathlete
- Pierre Antoine François Huber (1775–1832), French general

=== R ===
- Rhys Huber (born 1986), Canadian voice actor
- Richard Huber, New Zealand playwright, actor and director
- Robert Huber (disambiguation), multiple people
- Roberto Huber (1927–2008), Chilean sports shooter
- Rod Huber (born c. 1960 or 1961), American college football coach
- Roi Huber (born 1997), Israeli basketball player
- Roland Huber (born 1931), Swiss canoeist
- Rudolf Huber (born 1963), Austrian alpine skier
- Rupert Huber, multiple people

=== S ===
- Sasha Huber, artist
- Sebastian Huber (1901–1985), German bobsledder
- Șerban Huber (born 1951), Romanian water polo player
- Sherry Huber (1937–2022), American politician and environmentalist
- Siegmund Huber (1924–2018), Austrian cyclist
- Silas Huber (born 2005), Swiss footballer
- Sonya Huber, American essayist and writer
- Sophie Huber (born 1985), French freestyle swimmer
- Stefan Huber (born 1966), Swiss footballer
- Stephan Huber (born 1952), German sculptor and object artist
- Svenja Huber (born 1985), German handball player

=== T ===
- Thaddäus Huber (1742–1798), Austrian violinist and composer
- Therese Huber (1764–1829), German author
- Thomas Huber (disambiguation), multiple people
- Tobias Huber (born 1971), German nephrologist and internist
- Tomáš Huber (born 1985), Czech footballer
- Tytus Maksymilian Huber (1872–1950), Polish mechanical engineer, educator, and scientist

=== U ===
- Ulrik Huber (1636–1694), Dutch jurist
- Ulrike Huber (born 1966), Austrian handball player
- Urs Huber (born 1985), Swiss mountain biker

=== V ===
- Valerie Huber (born 1996), Austrian actress and beauty pageant titleholder
- Vernon Huber (1899–1967), 36th Governor of American Samoa
- Vicki Huber (born 1967), American retired middle-distance and cross-country runner
- Victor Aimé Huber (1800–1869), German social reformer, travel writer and a literature historian

=== W ===
- Wilfried Huber (born 1970), Italian luger
- William Huber (1852–1925), American labor leader
- William Russel Huber (1902–1982), American Navy lieutenant
- Wilhelm Huber (disambiguation)
- Wolf Huber (c. 1485–1553), Austrian painter
- Wolfgang Huber (disambiguation)

=== X ===
- Xavier Joseph Huber (1864–1944), Swiss-born cyclist

== See also ==
- Hüber (German-language surname)
- Hueber (French-language surname)
