= Hufner =

Landholding farmers in medieval Germany

A Hufner, also spelt Hüfner, was a farmer in medieval Europe who managed one or more oxgangs (German: Hufe) as his own property.

The actual names of these members of the farming community varied from region to region. In the Low Saxon dialect region the term Hovener or Hofener was used, in the Central German region they were mainly known as Hufner or Hüfner and in the Upper German region as Huber. In many areas, completely different names were also used, such as Ackermann, Pferdner or, in the Upper Saxon region, even besessene Mann or besessene Männer. (Note: Pferdner actually refers to a similar type of farmer who owned and managed one or more horse teams (pferdegespannen). This may be regional, as the name appears more rarely than the variants of Hufner.)

The Hufner was a full member of the community of farmers; he had a say in that community and was allowed to use the commons. In the social hierarchy of the village the Hufners, as full farmers (Vollbauern) and owners of a farmstead with, depending on the region, 30 to 100 morgens of land, ranked above the gardeners and the tenant farmers or Häuslern.

A host of surnames are derived from these occupational names and their regional variations. The most common of these is the name Huber, which, in the German-speaking world, is one of the five to ten most common surnames and is especially widespread in South Germany, Switzerland and Austria. As a result of regional variations in pronunciation of the surname Huber, other surnames have developed including Huemer, Humer, Haumer, Huebmer and Hueber. Also common are the forms Höf(f)ner and Hüb(e)ner.

The Hufner had the same social standing as the driver (Einspänner), the owner of a horse and carriage; both were liable for socage.

== Literature ==
- Heide Wunder: Die bäuerliche Gemeinde in Deutschland (= Kleine Vandenhoeck-Reihe 1483). Vandenhoeck und Ruprecht, Göttingen, 1986, ISBN 3-525-33473-7.
