= Hübner =

Hübner is a Germanic surname, sometimes spelled Huebner or Hubner.

The name means an agricultural worker, a farmer, possibly and specifically one who worked a "hube", which was a piece of land roughly equivalent to the English measurement of a "hide", about 120 acres. The appearance of this surname is attributed to medieval feudal Germany.

Notable people with this surname include:

== Academics ==
- Arthur Hübner (1885–1937), German philologist
- Chris Huebner (born 1969), Canadian Mennonite theologian
- Emil Hübner (1834–1901), German classical scholar, son of Julius Hübner
- Franz Hübner (1846–1877), German entomologist
- Hans Hübner (1837–1884), German chemist
- Jacob Hübner (1761–1826), German entomologist
- Johann Hübner (1668–1731), German geographer and scholar
- Karolina Hübner, American philosopher
- Robert Hübner (1948–2025), German chess grandmaster and papyrologist
- Sabine Renate Hübner (born 1976), German professor of ancient history

== Artists ==
- Julius Hübner (1806–1882), German painter, father of Emil Hübner
- Karl Hübner (1814–1879), German painter
- Mentor Huebner (1917–2001), American storyboard artist
- Ulrich Hübner (1872–1932), German painter

== Military personnel ==
- Alfred Hübner (1891–?), German World War I flying ace
- Clarence R. Huebner, American lieutenant general
- Rudolf Hübner, German World War II general

== Performers ==
- Bruno Hübner (1899–1983), Austrian actor
- Charly Hübner (born 1972), German actor
- Christian Hübner (born 1977), German opera bass
- Fritz Hübner (1933–2000), German opera bass
- Herbert Hübner (1889–1972), German actor
- Karin Hübner (1936-2005), German actress
- Ralf Hübner, German percussionist
- Zygmunt Hübner (1930-1989), Polish actor and director

== Politicians ==
- Danuta Hübner, European Commissioner for Regional Policy
- David Huebner, American lawyer and U.S. ambassador to New Zealand and Samoa
- Johannes Hübner (1956–2025), Austrian politician
- John Hubner (1840–1920), American politician and real estate developer
- Jorge Hübner, Chilean politician
- Count Joseph Alexander Hübner (1811–1892), Austrian diplomat, real name Josef Hafenbredl

== Sportspeople ==
- Andrea Hübner (born 1957), German swimmer
- Benjamin Hübner (born 1989), German football player
- Christopher Hübner, German footballer
- Dario Hübner, Italian footballer
- Florian Hübner, German footballer
- Frank Hübner (born 1950), German sailor
- Johan Hübner von Holst (1881–1945), Swedish sport shooter
- Julian Hübner (born 1983), German football coach
- Justin Hubner (born 2003), Indonesian footballer
- Michael Hübner (born 1959), German sprint track cyclist
- Ramon Menezes Hubner (born 1972), Brazilian footballer
- Rudi Hübner, German footballer
- Rudolf Hübner (athlete), Czech athlete
- Stefan Hübner (born 1975), German volleyball player
- Wolfgang Hübner, German weightlifter

== Writers ==
- Andrew Huebner, American author
- Sara Hübner de Fresno, Chilean author

== Others ==
- Berna Huebner, Filmmaker and Alzheimer's advocate
- George Huebner (1910–1996), American automotive engineer
- Martin Hübner (1723-1795), Danish jurist
- Robert Huebner (1924–1998), American physician

== See also ==
- Hübener
