= Hüber =

Hüber is a surname. Notable people with the surname include:

- Jakob Wilhelm Hüber (1787–1871), German landscape painter
- Sven Hüber (born 1964), East German former political officer

== See also ==
- Huber (German-language surname)
- Hueber (French-language surname)
