= Michael Mathias Prechtl =

German artist

Michael Mathias Prechtl (April 26, 1926 – March 19, 2003) was a German artist, illustrator and cartoonist.

Prechtl was born in Amberg. He served as a soldier on the Eastern Front during World War II and spent 1945-49 as a prisoner of war in the Soviet Union.

He is well known for illustrating German editions of literary classics such as works by E.T.A. Hoffmann, Thomas More, Dante, Goethe, Benvenuto Cellini, and the letters of Mozart. He received more publicity for the numerous front page illustrations he made for Der Spiegel in the 1980s.

Prechtl was married to the artist Frydl Zuleeg in 1956. He died in Nuremberg, aged 76.
