= Alfred Huber =

Alfred Huber may refer to:

- Alfred Huber (footballer) (1910–1986), German association football player
- Alfred Huber (tennis) (1930–1972), Austrian tennis player
