= Humer =

Humer is a surname. Notable people with the surname include:

- Adam Humer (1917–2001), Polish communist politician and murderer
- Franz Humer (born 1946), Swiss-Austrian businessman
- Jože Humer (1936–2012), Slovenian composer

== See also ==
- Hümér Hültl (1868–1940), Hungarian surgeon
