= Sven Hüber =

East German former political officer

- Military career
- Allegiance: East Germany
- Branch: East German Border Troops
- Rank: Political commissar

Sven Hüber (born 1964) is a German far-left police officer of federal police. He was an informant of East Germany's SED regime and member of the border troops that murdered Chris Gueffroy when he tried to flee the dictatorship. From 2022 to 2026 he was vice head of german police union Gewerkschaft der Polizei.

He was officer of East German border gard and former political officer. This has been the subject of criticism and controversy.

== Career ==
Hüber was born in Görlitz. As a political officer, Hüber was responsible for giving the soldiers political instruction and propaganda. He worked for the Berlin regiment 33 (Treptow). His unit was responsible for the fatal shooting on February 6, 1989 of Chris Gueffroy, the last person to be shot on the inner German border. Hüber has tried to ban the mention of his name in connection with his work as a political officer and has sued a German historian. His case and the question of how to deal with moral responsibility have been widely discussed in German newspapers.

A similar case happened in March 2008, when Holm Singer, a former East German Stasi informant who betrayed local church officials under the pseudonym IM Schubert, won a court battle to prevent an exhibition from including his real name and clandestine activities. The interim injunction was later cancelled, as his name was considered to be of "historical interest".

== 2026 controversies ==
In summer 2026 Hübner warned, that police officer had to help the possible AfD government in Saxony-Anhalt by there duty. In an article he discriped possible ways for officers not to become a tool of far right politics.

In August 2026, the far right news portal Apollo News reported on allegations made by Axel Krause, a former East German conscript who served under Hüber in Border Regiment 33 during 1987 and 1988. In a sworn affidavit, Krause alleged that Hüber physically tortured and abused a captured escapee in spring 1988.

Through his attorney, Hüber submitted a written response to Apollo News denying all allegations of torture or misconduct.
