= Paul Huber =

Paul Huber may refer to:

- Paul Huber (physicist) (1910-1971), Swiss-American physicist
- Paul B. Huber (1934-2021), American economist
