= Eh'häusl =

Hotel in Amberg, Germany

Coordinates: 49°26′41.00″N 11°51′09.80″E

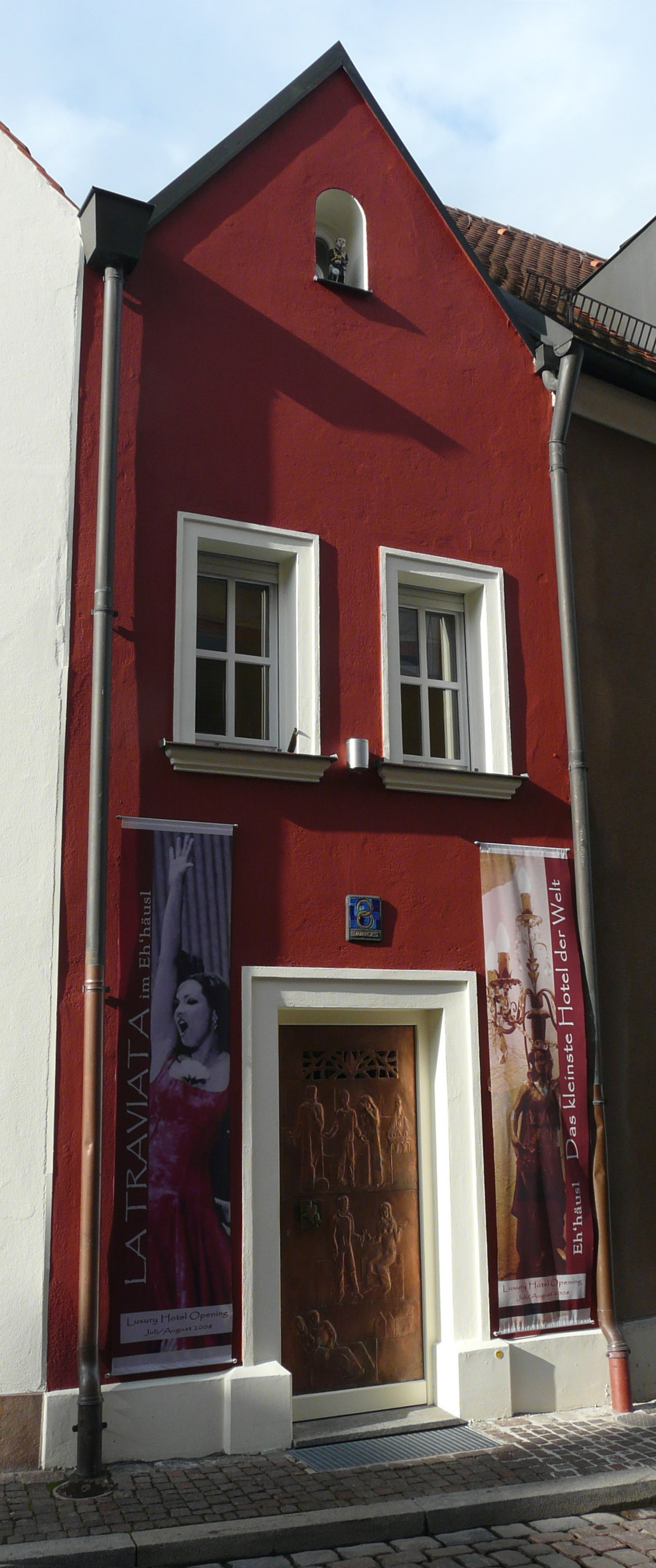
The Eh’häusl

The Eh'häusl is an eight-foot-wide hotel in the city of Amberg, in the Upper Palatinate of Bavaria in Germany. According to the operator, the Urban Planning Society of the town of Amberg, it is now regarded as "the smallest hotel in the world."

The name of the building, derived possibly from Early New High German Ehalten (for servants) and was probably reinterpreted in the vernacular to marriage house or matrimonial home in the 18th or 19th century.

Built in 1728, the 2 metre wide house was sold between young couples to circumvent local laws prohibiting marriage between poor people who did not own their own home.

The house was built on an area of approximately 20 square meters with no side walls and is mounted between the two neighboring houses. Though tiny in size the hotel has flat-screen TV, a mini spa, and several other amenities for its guests.
