= Michael Huber =

Michael Huber may refer to:

- Michael Huber (writer) (1727–1804), German translator and art expert
- Michael Huber (priest) (1841–1911), Bavarian priest and Centre party politician
- Michael Huber (footballer) (born 1990), Austrian footballer
- Spike Huber (born 1955), American retired wrestler
