= Portrait of Pauline Hübner =

1829 painting by Julius Hübner

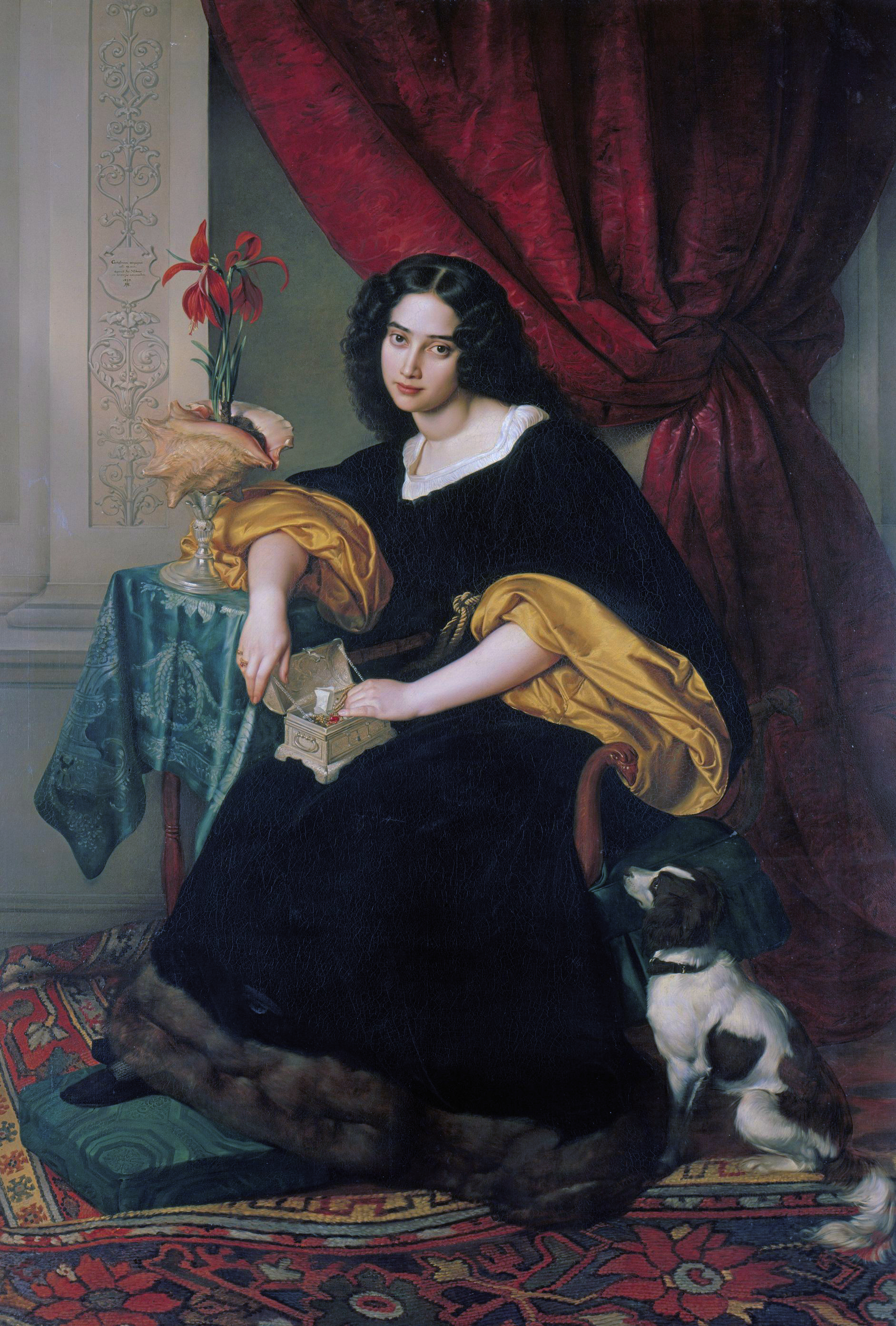
Portrait of Pauline Hübner (1829)

Portrait of Pauline Hübner is an oil on canvas portrait by Julius Hübner of his new wife, Pauline Charlotte (née Bendemann). He produced it just after their marriage in 1829 and it is held to belong to the Düsseldorf school of painting. It is now in the Alte Nationalgalerie in Berlin.
