= Elisabeth Huber-Sannwald =

Austrian researcher

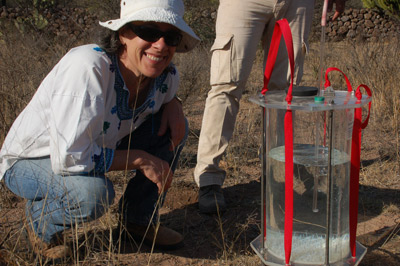
- Elisabeth Huber-Sannwald (2017)
- Born: Austria
- Education: Ph.D.
- Alma mater: University of Innsbruck; Utah State University
- Known for: Ecosystem ecology research in Mexico
- Scientific career
- Fields: Biology, botany, rangeland ecology
- Institutions: Instituto Potosino de Investigación Científica y Tecnológica

Elisabeth Huber-Sannwald is an Austrian researcher specializing in ecosystem ecology. She is a Full Research Professor in Ecology and Global Environmental Change and Complex Environmental Systems; she served as Department Head of the Division of Environmental Sciences at Instituto Potosino de Investigación Científica y Tecnológica (IPICYT) in San Luis Potosí, Mexico.

== Education ==
In 1990, she completed her master's degree in Biology and Botany at the University of Innsbruck, in Innsbruck, Austria, where she studied the effects of land-use change on biodiversity. In 1996, she obtained her Ph.D. in Rangeland Ecology at the Utah State University, Logan, Utah, U.S. She did a postdoctoral stay at the Institute of Ecology of the University of Buenos Aires as Scientific Officer of Focus 4: Global Change and Ecological Complexity of the International Program on the Geosphere and Biosphere.

== Career and research ==
From 1998 to 2001, she was a research assistant at the Institute of Grassland and Foliage Sciences of the Technical University of Munich, Freising, Germany. She participated in the design and development of the IPICYT, creating the Division of Environmental Sciences and the program of Postgraduate in Environmental Sciences. In 2001, she joined IPICYT; she is currently Titular C research professor, member of the National System of Researchers" System (SNII) Level III, in the area of Global Environmental Change and Complex Environmental Systems.

Huber-Sannwald holds the position of Full Research Professor. Her research is based on the ecology of ecosystems, focusing on the role of plants and soil microorganisms in the biogeochemical and eco-hydrological processes of the arid zones of northern Mexico. She has focused on studying the effects of social and global aspects, such as cattle grazing, land use change and soil degradation in the integrity of socio-ecological systems for a sustainable development of rural livelihoods. She is founder and coordinator of the International Network for Dryland Sustainability (RISZA), the first national network on drylands social-ecological systems, which fosters the co-generation of knowledge linked to drylands assessment, social-ecological conservation, restoration, management and development projects with local, national, regional and transnational transdisciplinary research alliances including academics, government representatives, civil society members, NGOs, representatives of the private sector, and indigenous groups. She is also the lead founder of the national network of Social-Ecological Participatory Observatories in Mexico, a social-ecological innovation to collectively produce, compile and exchange knowledge, strengthen transversal multi-stakeholder partnerships for transdisciplinary research and collaborative environmental governance, and to foster intercultural dialogue at the science-policy interface targeting sustainable dryland development. She currently serves as a member of the Science-Policy-Interface of the United Nations Convention to Combat Desertification.

Huber-Sannwald was the Regional President of the Mexican Scientific Society of Ecology. She served as associate editor of the journals Rangeland Ecology (2011-2014), Ecological Applications. (2014-2024), Frontiers in Ecology and the Environment. (2018-2024). She is currently Editor-in-Chief of Earth Stewardship.a new international, open access journal of the Ecological Society of America in partnership with Wiley. She is the coordinator of the Grupo Regional en Agostaderos Mexicanos para su Investigación y el Liderazgo de su Uso Sustentable (Regional Group in Mexican Ranges for its Research and Leadership of its Sustainable Use) (GRACILIS) and of the Red Mexicana de Investigación Ecológica a Largo Plazo (Mexican Network for Long-Term Ecological Research) (RED MEX-LTER); and the coordinator of the Inter-American Network for Atmospheric and Biospheric Studies (IANABIS). Huber-Sannwald is a member of the Scientific Committee of the Ecological Society of America (ESA); the executive committee of the International Network to Combat Desertification (ARIDnet). She is a member of the Academic Technical Committee, and is responsible for Axis 2/Internationalization of the CONAHCYT Socio-Ecosystems and Sustainability Network. She is also a member of the executive committee of the Consultative Group on Ecosystem Services of the Sociedad de Toxicología y Química Ambiental.

== Recognition ==
- SNII III. CONAHCYT 2022
- SNII II. CONAHCYT. 2007.
- SNII I. CONAHCYT. 2002.
- Heritage Chair Level II. CONACYT. 2001.
- Don Dwyer, Rangeland Resources Department Scientific Excellence, Utah State University. Utah State University. 1997.
- Fulbright Research. Fulbright. 1991.
- Endowment Scholarship. University of Innsbruck. 1987.

== Selected works ==
- Delgado-Baquerizo, M., Maestre, F., Gallardo, A. et al. (2013) "Decoupling of soil nutrient cycles as a function of aridity in global drylands". Nature 502 (7473), 672–676.
- Huber-Sannwald, E., Martínez-Tagüeña, N., Espejel, I., Lucatello, S., Coppock, D. L., Reyes Gómez, V. M. (2019) "Introduction: International Network for the Sustainability of Drylands—Transdisciplinary and Participatory Research for Dryland Stewardship and Sustainable Development", Stewardship of Future Drylands and Climate Change in the Global South, Springer Nature Switzerland, pp. 1–24. ISBN 978-3-030-22463-9, Switzerland.
- Stuart Chapin III F., E. Sala O., Huber-Sannwald E. (2001) "Global Biodiversity in a Changing Environment: Scenarios for the 21st century", Springer Verlag, p. 376.
- Concostrina-Zubiri, L., Martinez, I., Huber-Sannwald, E., Escudero, A. (2013) "Biological Soil Crusts effects and responses in arid ecosystems: recent advances at the species l". Ecosistemas 22, (3). 95–100.
