= Amberg =

- Town
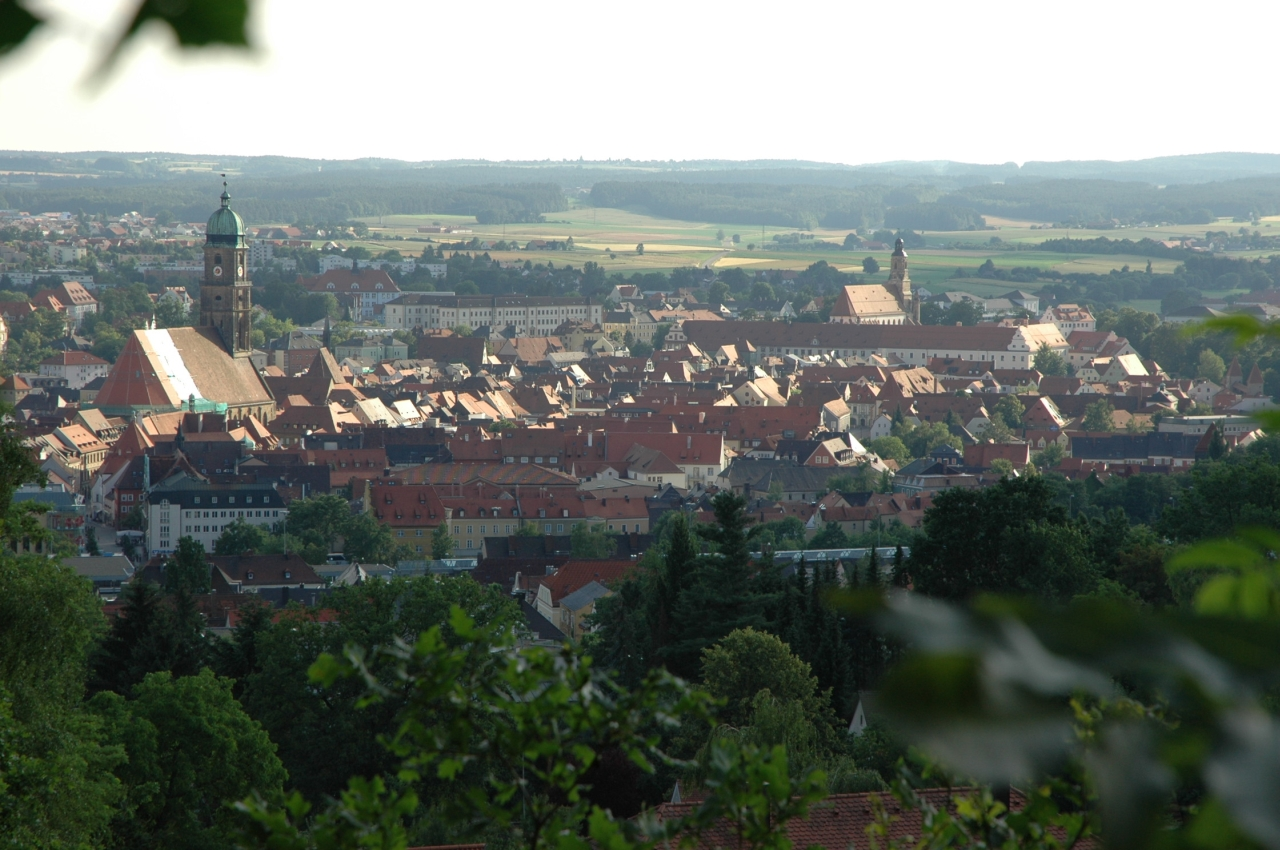
- View from Mariahilfberg towards the Amberg Old Town, 2004

- Flag Coat of arms
- Interactive map of Amberg
- Location within Germany Location within Bavaria
- Coordinates: 49°26′40″N 11°50′54″E
- Country: Germany
- State: Bavaria
- Admin. region: Oberpfalz
- District: Urban district

Government
  - Mayor (2026–32): Michael Fritz (FW)

Area
  - Total: 50.13 km^{2} (19.36 sq mi)
- Elevation: 374 m (1,227 ft)

Population (2025-12-31)
  - Total: 42,631
  - Density: 850.4/km^{2} (2,203/sq mi)
- Time zone: UTC+01:00 (CET)
  - Summer (DST): UTC+02:00 (CEST)
- Postal codes: 92224
- Dialling codes: 09621
- Vehicle registration: AM
- Website: amberg.de

Amberg (German pronunciation: [ˈambɛʁk]) is a town in Bavaria, Germany. It is located in the Upper Palatinate about halfway between Regensburg and Bayreuth.

== History ==
The town was first mentioned in 1034 with the name Ammenberg. It became an important trading centre in the Middle Ages, exporting mainly iron ore and iron products. In 1269, together with Bamberg, the town became subordinate to the Wittelsbach dynasty which ruled Bavaria.

In 1329, the town and the entire region fell to the Palatinate branch of the Wittelsbach family. The region adopted the name Upper Palatinate. It was no longer part of the duchy of Bavaria politically, though in geographic terms it was regarded as Bavarian and the region was part of the Bavarian circle in the organization of the Imperial Circles. In the 16th century, the rulers of Upper Palatinate turned to Protestantism. The town turned to Lutheranism. Later attempts of the ruling family to introduce the more radical Calvinism failed due to the reluctance of its citizens. In 1628, Amberg and the Upper Palatinate became part of the electorate of Bavaria. The inhabitants were given the choice to return to Catholicism or emigrate. Many families left the town and moved to the Free Imperial Cities of Regensburg and Nuremberg.

On 24 August 1796, during the French Revolutionary Wars, a major battle, the Battle of Amberg was fought in the city and its environs at which 35,000 French, under the command of Jean Baptiste Jourdan fought with 40,000 Austrians under the command of Archduke Charles; the French suffered significantly more losses in the Austrian victory. Amberg was the regional capital of Upper Palatinate until 1810 when power was transferred to the larger city of Regensburg.

After World War II, when Bavaria fell into the American Sector, Amberg was home to Pond Barracks, a United States Army post. I. F. Stone writes about it in his book Underground to Palestine (pp. 31ff). The post was closed in 1992 and the facility turned over to the local community for housing, most of it for social housing.

In late 2018, the town was the site of the Amberg attacks resulting in Rainer Wendt asking the federal government to take a stand on the case. The city was reported to be "in a state of emergency." Joachim Herrmann, the Bavarian minister of the Interior, visited Amberg for consultations. Horst Seehofer, the federal minister of the Interior, said "the violent attacks (were) worrisome."

=== Jewish history ===
Jews had settled in Amberg before 1294, when the first documentation can be found. Shortly after, in 1298, thirteen of the town Jews died during the Rindfleisch massacres. Nevertheless, in 1347 six families received permission to settle in Amberg and twenty years after, in 1367, a Yeshivah was opened in it, although the Jewish community was expelled from Amberg in 1403. Upon the expulsion, the synagogue was annexed to the nearby church. Twelve Jews remained in town in 1942. The few survivors returned to the town after 1945, and a displaced persons camp named Amberg-near the town-housed mostly Jewish refugees and survivors. As a result of immigration from the former USSR to Germany, the Jewish population grew to about 275 in 2003. There is a synagogue in town.

== Subdistricts ==
Amberg has 25 sub-districts, which include its surrounding villages:

- Amberg
- Atzlricht
- Bergsteig
- Bernricht
- Eglsee
- Fiederhof
- Fuchsstein
- Gailoh
- Gewerbegebiet-Gailoh
- Gewerbegebiet-West
- Gärbershof
- Karmensölden
- Kemnathermühl
- Kleinraigering
- Krumbach
- Lengenloh
- Luitpoldhöhe
- Neubernricht
- Neumühle
- Neuricht
- Oberammersricht
- Raigering
- Schäflohe
- Schweighof
- Speckmannshof
- Unterammersricht

== Lord mayors ==
- 1866–1892: Vincent König
- 1892–1907: Josef Heldmann
- 1907–1913: Georg Schön
- 1913–1933: Eduard Klug, BVP
- 1933: Otto Saugel (temporary)
- 1933–1945: Josef Filbig, NSDAP
- 1945–1946: Christian Endemann, SPD
- 1946: Eduard Klug
- 1946: Christian Endemann, SPD
- 1946–1952: Michael Lotter, CSU
- 1952–1958: Josef Filbig, Deutsche Gemeinschaft (Deutschland)
- 1958–1970: Wolf Steininger, CSU
- 1970–1990: Franz Prechtl, CSU
- 1990–2014: Wolfgang Dandorfer, CSU
- 2014–2026: Michael Cerny, CSU
- 2026–: Michael Fritz, FW

== Population ==
Historical population

Year	Pop.	±%
1400	2,720	—
1450	2,980	+9.6%
1500	3,180	+6.7%
1550	3,730	+17.3%
1600	4,280	+14.7%
1630	4,910	+14.7%
1648	3,274	−33.3%
1700	3,720	+13.6%
1713	1,900	−48.9%
1750	4,537	+138.8%

Year	Pop.	±%
1800	5,763	+27.0%
1840	11,793	+104.6%
1859	12,312	+4.4%
1871	13,005	+5.6%
1880	14,583	+12.1%
1890	19,126	+31.2%
1900	22,039	+15.2%
1910	25,242	+14.5%
1919	26,009	+3.0%
1925	28,387	+9.1%

Year	Pop.	±%
1939	31,775	+11.9%
1946	36,795	+15.8%
1950	37,920	+3.1%
1960	41,849	+10.4%
1970	41,345	−1.2%
1980	44,264	+7.1%
1990	43,111	−2.6%
2000	43,794	+1.6%
2010	43,755	−0.1%
2014	41,535	−5.1%

== Sights ==
A defining feature of the town is the Stadtbrille (literally: town spectacles)–a bridge, originally a part of the town fortifications, whose arches reflected on the river waters resemble a pair of spectacles.

Other tourist attractions in Amberg:

- Market Square, which contains the Gothic town hall (built in 1358) and the late-Gothic parish church of St. Martin
- The New Palace, the former residence of the counts of the Rhenish Palatinate, built at the beginning of the 15th century and renovated in 1603

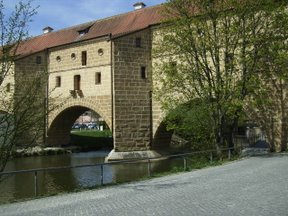
Stadtbrille, April 2007

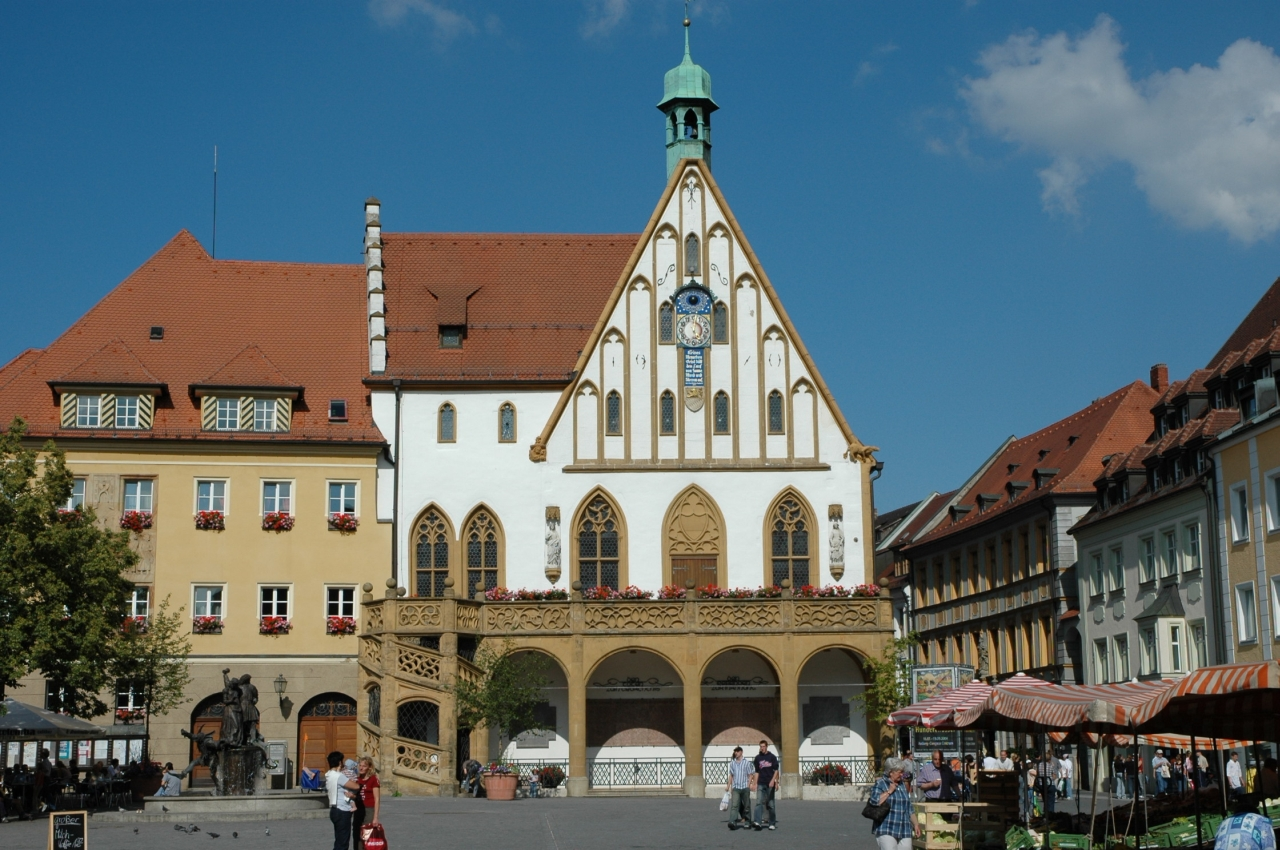
The Gothic town hall, July 2004

- A well-preserved section of the medieval walls and gates
- The baroque Franciscan monastery on the Hill of Our Lady Help of Christians (Germ. Mariahilfberg) above the town; the hill was given its name during the bubonic plague in the Thirty Years' War in 1633/4 when the locals beseeched the Virgin Mary to rid them of the plague
- The 'Little Wedding House' (local German dialect Eh'häusl), claimed by town authorities to be the world's smallest hotel; built in 1728, the 2 metre wide hotel was 'sold' to young couples for one night to circumvent laws prohibiting marriages between poor people
- The town museum (Stadtmuseum Amberg) has exhibits on life and industry in Amberg, the history of clothing and works of Michael Mathias Prechtl and houses travelling exhibitions.
- Air Museum (Luftmuseum), opened in 2006

== Twin towns – sister cities ==
Amberg is twinned with:

- Bad Bergzabern, Germany
- Bystrzyca Kłodzka, Poland
- Desenzano del Garda, Italy
- Périgueux, France
- Trikala, Greece
- Ústí nad Orlicí, Czech Republic
- Kranj, Slovenia

== Notable people ==
- Karl Addicks (born 1950), politician (FDP), Member of Bundestag 2004–2009
- Hans Aumeier (1906–1948), Nazi SS officer in a leading position in several concentration camps executed for war crimes
- Hans Baumann (1914–1988), elementary school teacher, poet, song composer, Children's Book Author, Nazi official
- Alexander Bugera (born 1978), football player
- Sara Däbritz (born 1995), German football player (Real Madrid, Germany national team)
- Daniel Ernemann (born 1976), football player
- Heiner Fleischmann (1914–1963), motorcycle racer (mainly on NSU)
- Fritz Hilpert (born 1956), musician (Kraftwerk)
- Michael Huber (1841–1911), priest
- Theodor Kaes (1852–1913), German neurologist, was a native of Amberg
- Barbara Meier (born 1986), German fashion model
- Franz Stigler (1915–2008), German World War II Luftwaffe fighter ace, 45 aerial victories, member of Jagdgeschwader 27, and Jagdverband 44. Known best for Charlie Brown and Franz Stigler incident.
- Kathrine Switzer (born 1947), first woman to run the Boston Marathon, was born to American parents in Amberg

== Sport ==
- FC Amberg, football team
