= Chris Gueffroy =

Last person shot at Berlin Wall

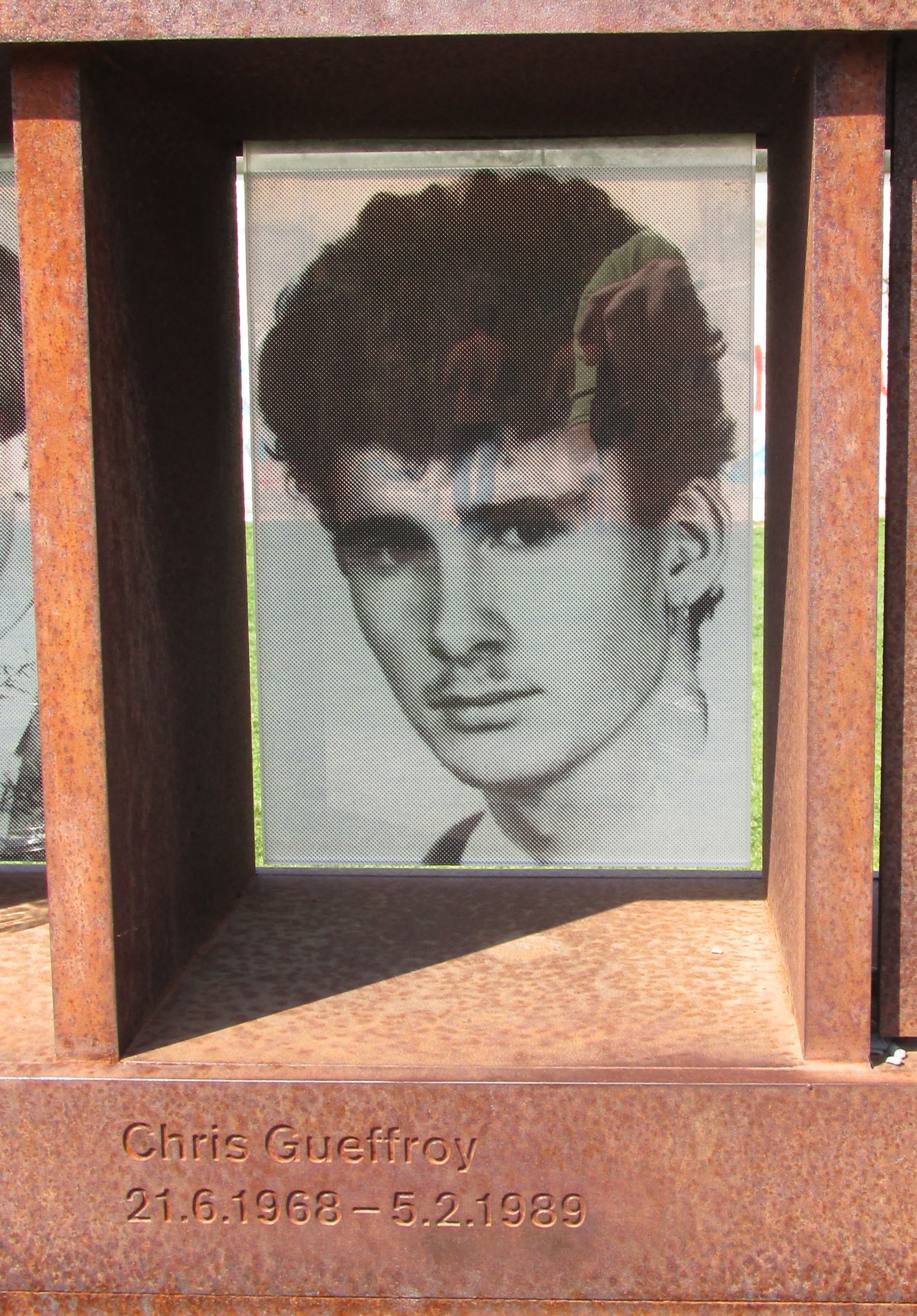
- Chris Gueffroy, at the Window of Remembrance, Berlin Wall Memorial, Bernauer Straße
- Born: 21 June 1968; Pasewalk, East Germany
- Died: 5 February 1989 (aged 20); Border Strip within Baumschulenweg, East Berlin, East Germany
- Cause of death: Shot by a guard whilst attempting to leave East Berlin
- Body discovered: Britz district canal 52.458914°N 13.469°E
- Resting place: Baumschulenweg Cemetery, Berlin-Treptow; 52.461355°N 13.495368°E
- Monuments: Chris Gueffroy memorial
- Known for: Last to be killed by use of firearms at the Berlin Wall

Chris Gueffroy (21 June 1968 – 6 February 1989) was the last person to be shot and the second-last to be murdered in an escape attempt while trying to escape from East Berlin to West Berlin across the Berlin Wall.

== Biography ==
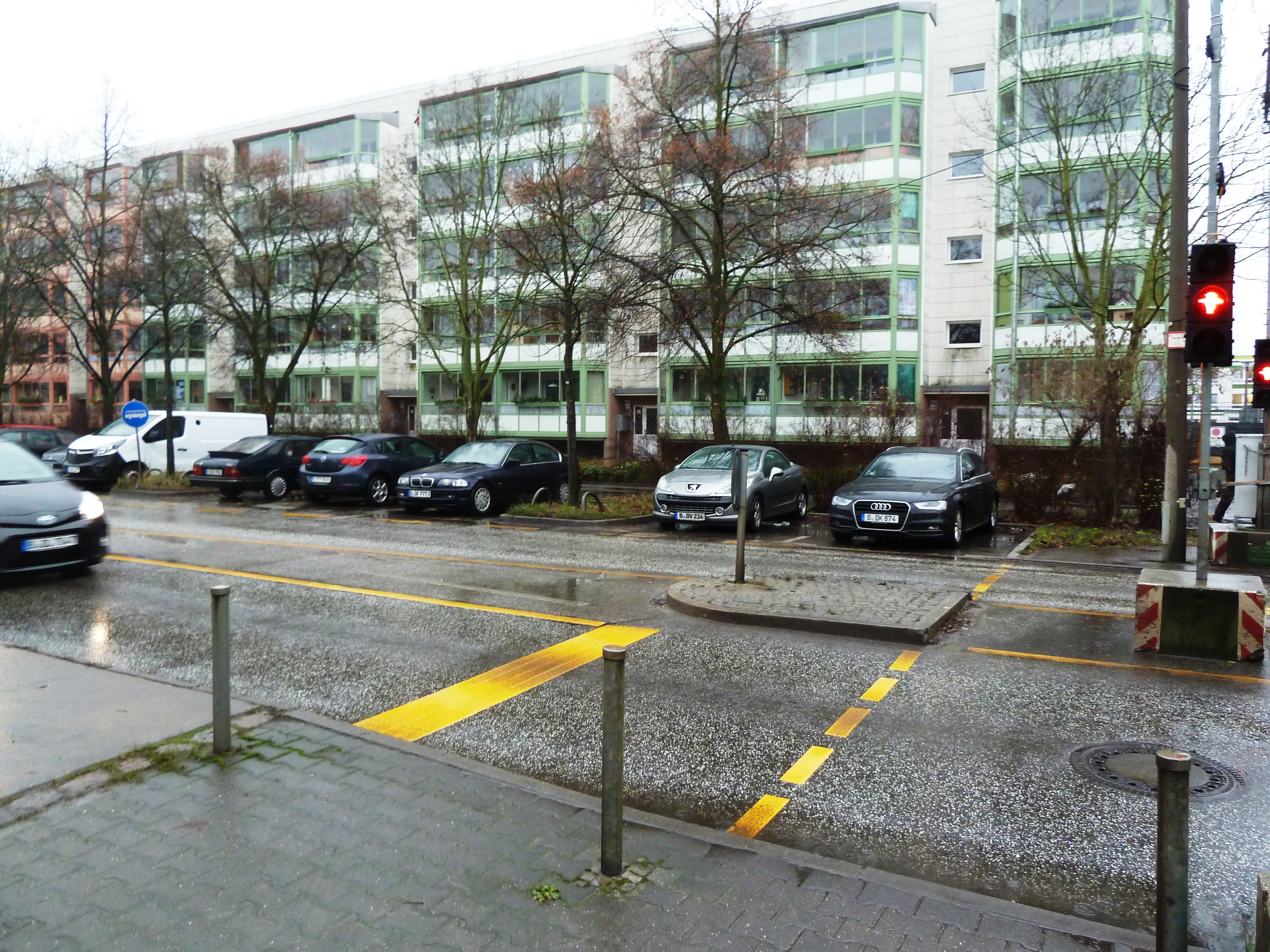
Südostallee 218, Johannisthal, Treptow, East Berlin. Last residence of Berlin Wall victim Chris Gueffroy.

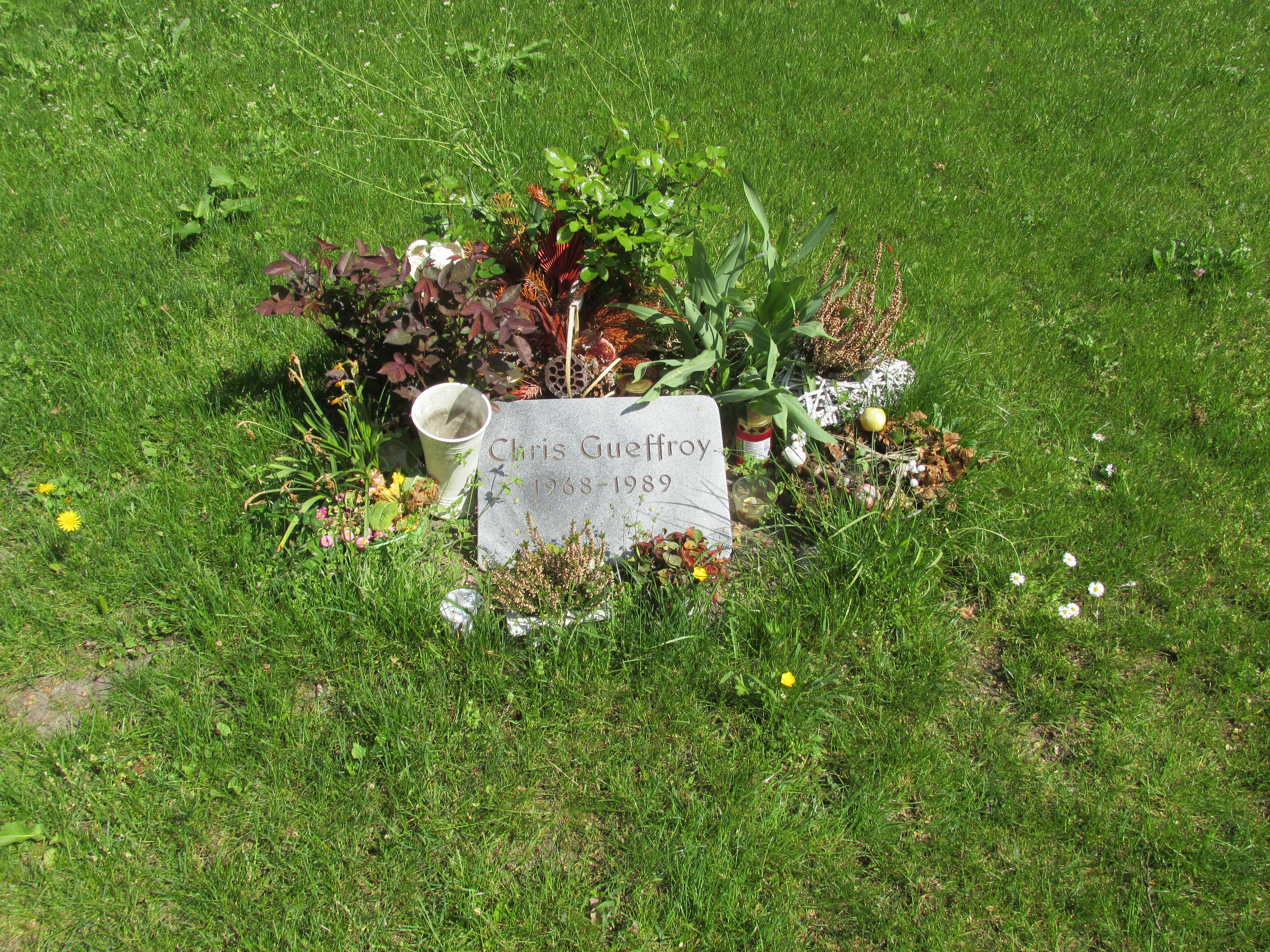
Close-up of Chris Gueffroy's grave, April 2014, at the Baumschulenweg Friedhof/Neuer Städtischer Friedhof in Berlin-Treptow

Chris Gueffroy was born in Pasewalk, Bezirk Neubrandenburg (present-day Mecklenburg-Vorpommern) on 21 June 1968. He had an older brother, Stefan Gueffroy.

He moved to Schwedt in 1970, the same year that his mother, Karin Gueffroy, and his father, Allois Gueffroy, divorced. Three years later, when he was five years old, he moved to Berlin with his mother and his brother. When he was in the third grade, he was sent to the youth sports school SC Dynamo Berlin, based on his gymnastic talent. After he finished school he refused to pursue an officer's career track in the National People's Army and was consequently denied the right to study at university, ending his dream of becoming an actor or a pilot. In September 1985 he began an apprenticeship in the Schönefeld airport restaurant near Berlin after which he worked in a number of different restaurants. As a waiter, his income was better than average, and he had a strong degree of freedom, but he was disgusted by the widespread corruption in the restaurant business. His friend Christian Gaudian, whom he had met at gastronomy school, shared his feelings. At twenty, he found it increasingly unbearable to think that he would remain locked up with the knowledge that it would always be this way and that he would never have the freedom to decide for himself where he wanted to live. In mid-January 1989, upon learning that he was to be conscripted into the National People's Army the following May, he and Gaudian decided to leave East Germany.

== Death ==
Gueffroy and Gaudian based their decision to try to flee over the wall on mistaken beliefs that the Schießbefehl, the standing order to shoot anyone who attempted to cross the wall, had been lifted (it had not), and that the Swedish prime minister Ingvar Carlsson was to pay a state visit to East Berlin (he had already left when they attempted their escape). Their attempted escape from East Berlin to West Berlin, along the Britz district canal, would take place on the night of 5–6 February 1989, about two kilometres (1¼ miles) from what would be Gueffroy's last residence on Südostallee 218, Johannisthal, Treptow, East Berlin. Climbing the last metal lattice fence, the two were discovered and came under fire from the NVA border troops. Gueffroy was hit in the chest by two shots and died in the border strip. Gaudian, badly but not fatally injured, was arrested and was sentenced on 24 May 1989 to imprisonment of three years by the Pankow district court for attempted illegal border-crossing of the first degree ("versuchten ungesetzlichen Grenzübertritts im schweren Fall"). In September 1989 Gaudian was freed on bail by the East German government, and on 17 October 1989 he was transferred to West Berlin.

Chris Gueffroy is often erroneously named as the last person to die in the attempt to cross the wall, but he was in fact only the last to be killed through the use of weapons, and the second-last to die in an escape attempt. Winfried Freudenberg died in the crash of an improvised balloon aircraft by which he crossed the border into West Berlin on 8 March 1989.

== Aftermath ==
As compensation for Karin Gueffroy's loss, the East German government allowed her to go to West Berlin and visit Chris's grave in Baumschulenweg weekly, with the condition that she would not speak to Western media about the incident. She would take residence in the West Berlin district of Moabit, on Oldenburger Straße 36.

The four border guards involved at the time at first obtained an award (Leistungsabzeichen der Grenztruppen) from the chief of the Grenzkommandos Mitte border guards, Erich Wöllner, and a prize of 150 East German Marks each. However, after the reunification of East and West Germany, they were prosecuted by the Berlin regional court. Two of the former border guards, Mike Schmidt (now a millwright with two children), and Peter Schmett (now an electrician with three children), were acquitted and released in January 1992, because the presiding judge, Theodor Seidel, ruled that they "did not kill and did not intend to kill". A third former border guard, Andreas Kuehnpast (now unemployed), received a suspended sentence of two years. The fourth former border guard, Ingo Heinrich (now an electronic engineer), who was responsible for the mortal shot in the heart, was at first sentenced to three and a half years of jail. On appeal, the Bundesgerichtshof (High Court of Justice) in 1994 reduced the penalty to a suspended sentence of two years.

In 2000, two SED functionaries, Siegfried Lorenz and Hans-Joachim Böhme, were tried for the death of Gueffroy and two other young men, but acquitted as the judge could find no evidence that they might have been able to lift the shoot-to-kill order. The case was retried on 7 August 2004, and the two men were found guilty and given suspended sentences of 15 months each. The judge explained that the short sentences were due to the length of time since the events. This was the last case concerning deaths on the inner German border.

On 21 June 2003, which would have been his 35th birthday, a monument to Gueffroy was erected on the bank of the Britz district canal. The monument was designed by Berlin artist Karl Biedermann. One of the crosses at the White Crosses memorial site next to the Reichstag building is devoted to him.

On 13 August 2010 the Britzer Allee between Treptow and Neukölln was renamed Chris-Gueffroy-Allee.

== In popular culture ==
Gueffroy's life and escape attempt was portrayed in the 2025 BIFA-qualifying British-German short film Whispers of Freedom. Written and directed by Brandon Ashplant and produced by Jonathan Tammuz, the film features Cameron Ashplant as Chris Gueffroy.. The film had its German Premiere at the DDR Museum in Berlin, and regularly screens at the Museum's exhibition cinema - including on 5 February in commemoration of Gueffroy's death.

== Memorials ==
Memorials to his death are located in the "White Crosses" memorial, next to the Reichstag building, in the "Window Of Remembrance" of the Berlin Wall Memorial in Berlin and near the former scene of the attempted escape, on the Teltow Canal.

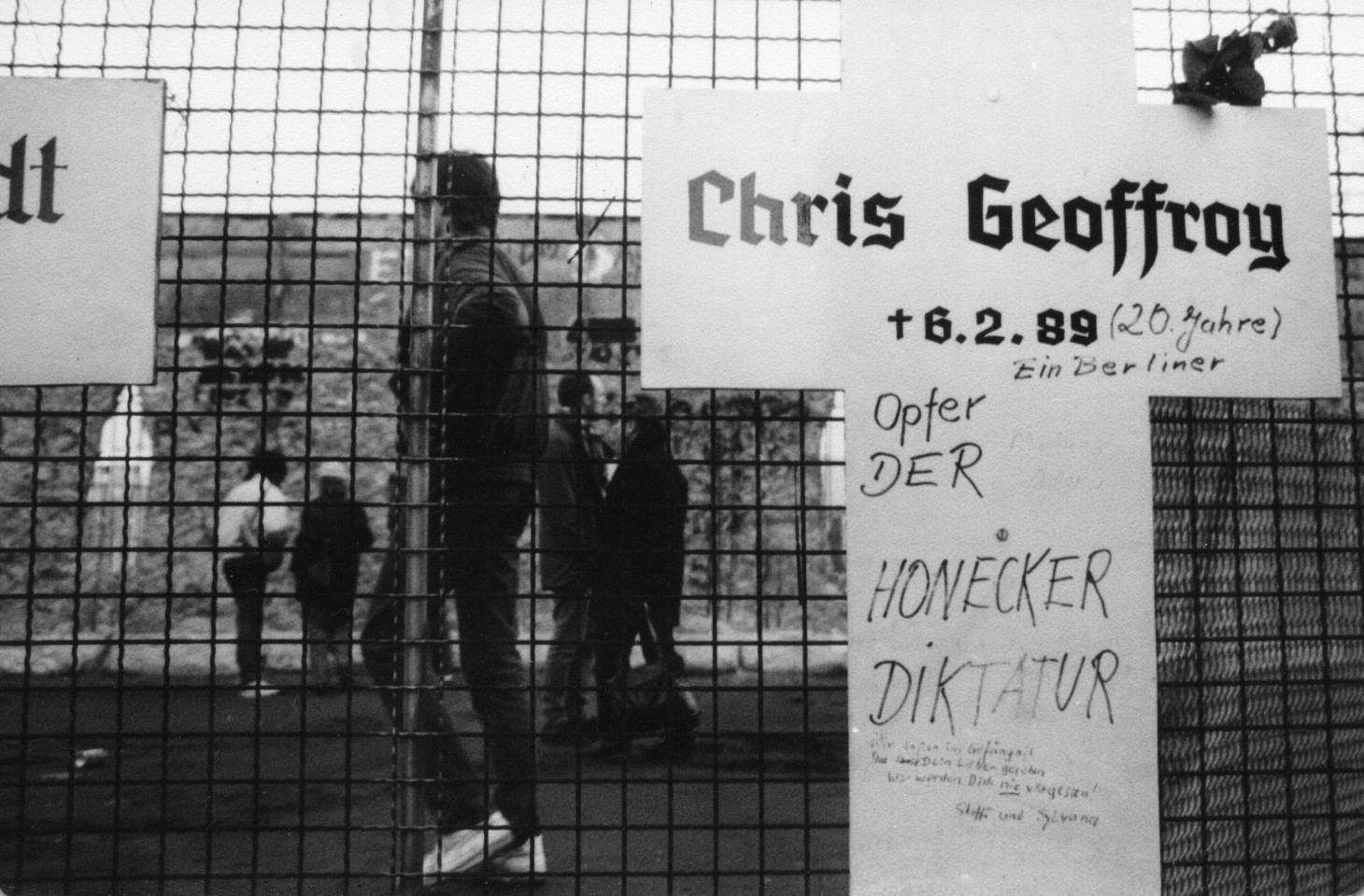
Commemorative tablet to Chris Gueffroy. In the background is the partly destroyed Wall, near Reichstag. Winter 1989/90.

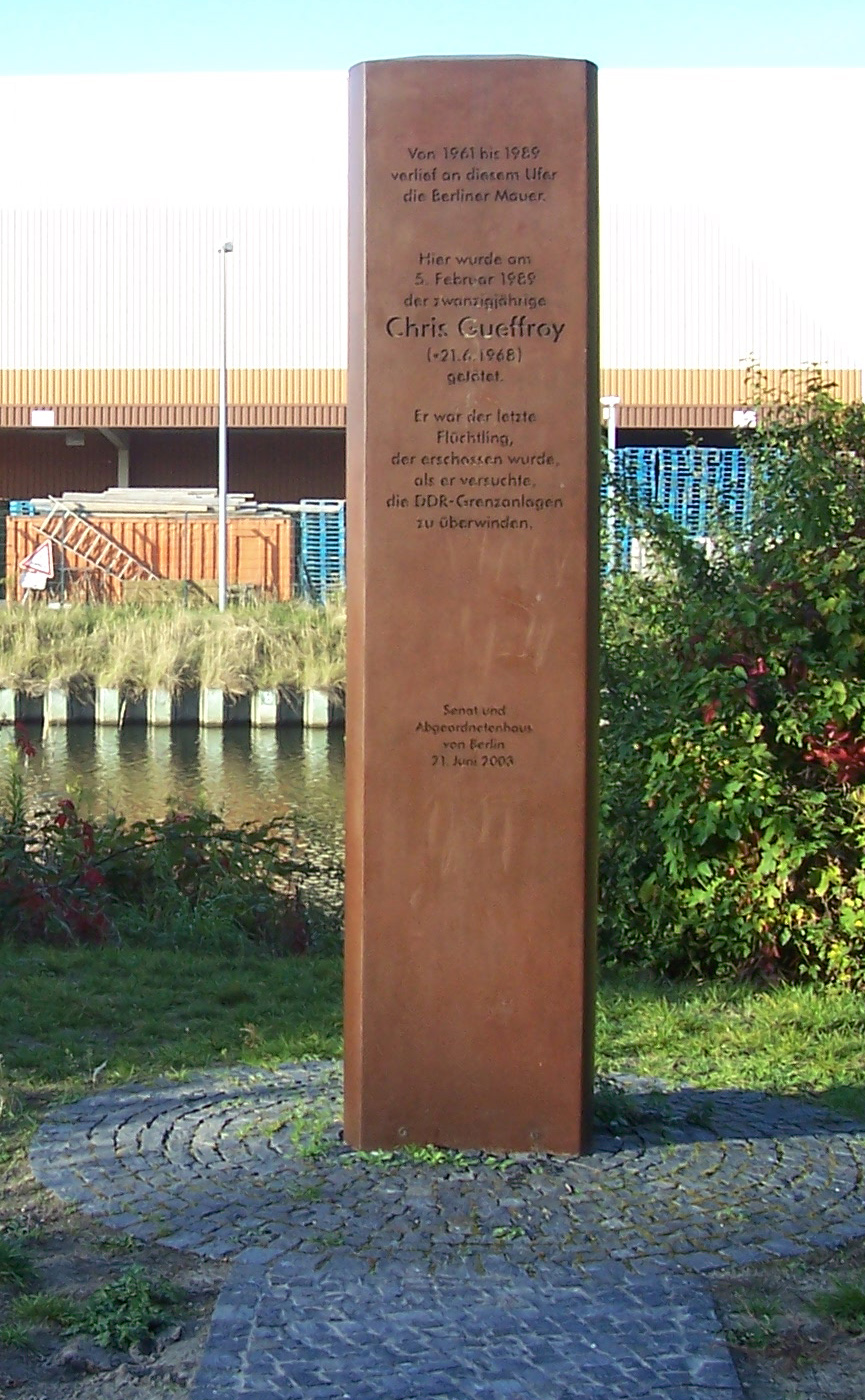
Monument erected in 2003 at the Britz district canal in Berlin's Treptow-Köpenick borough.

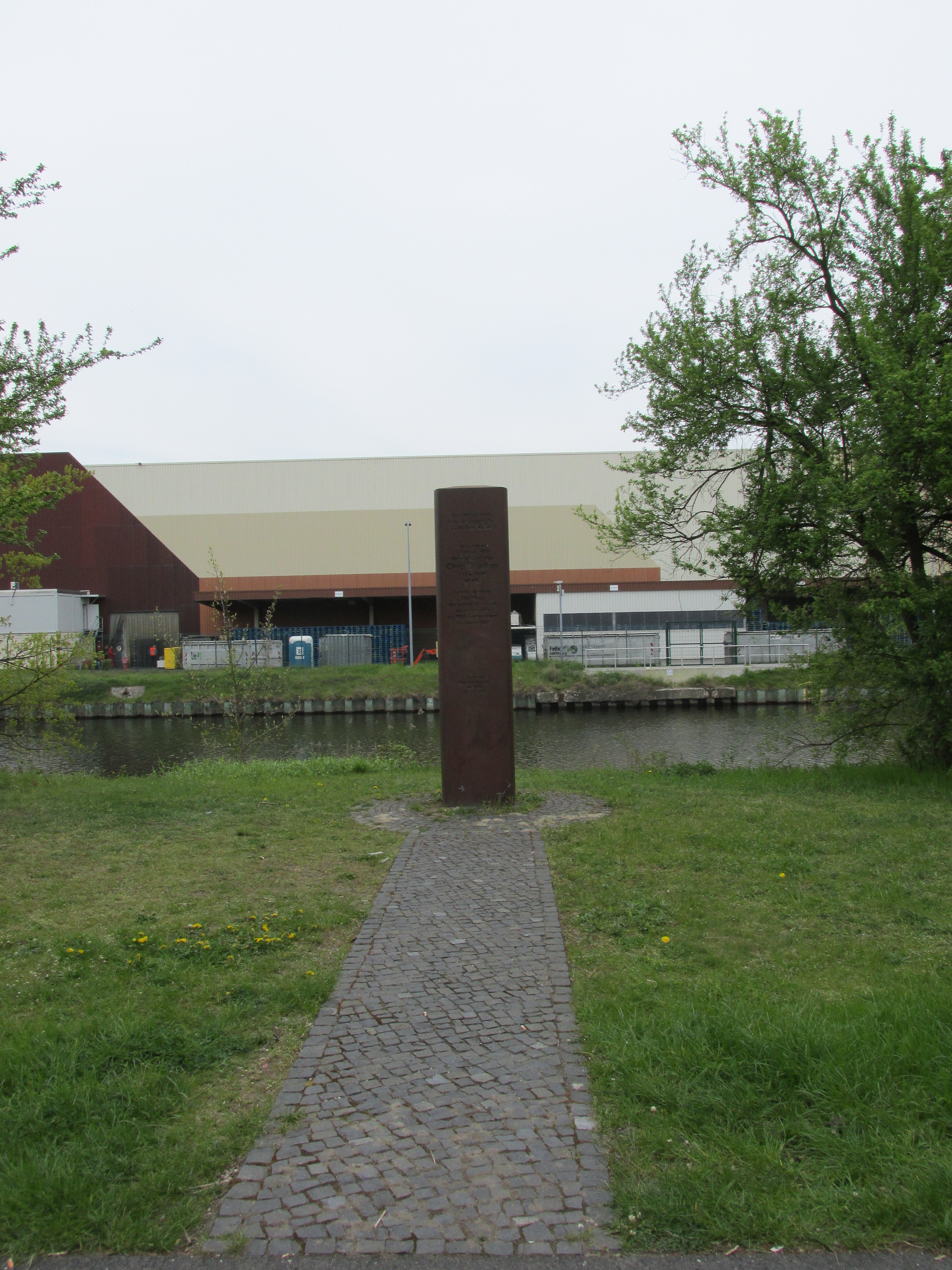
Distant view of the Chris Gueffroy Steele, showing what was Chris' "letzte Blick" (last view) as he attempted to escape from Berlin.

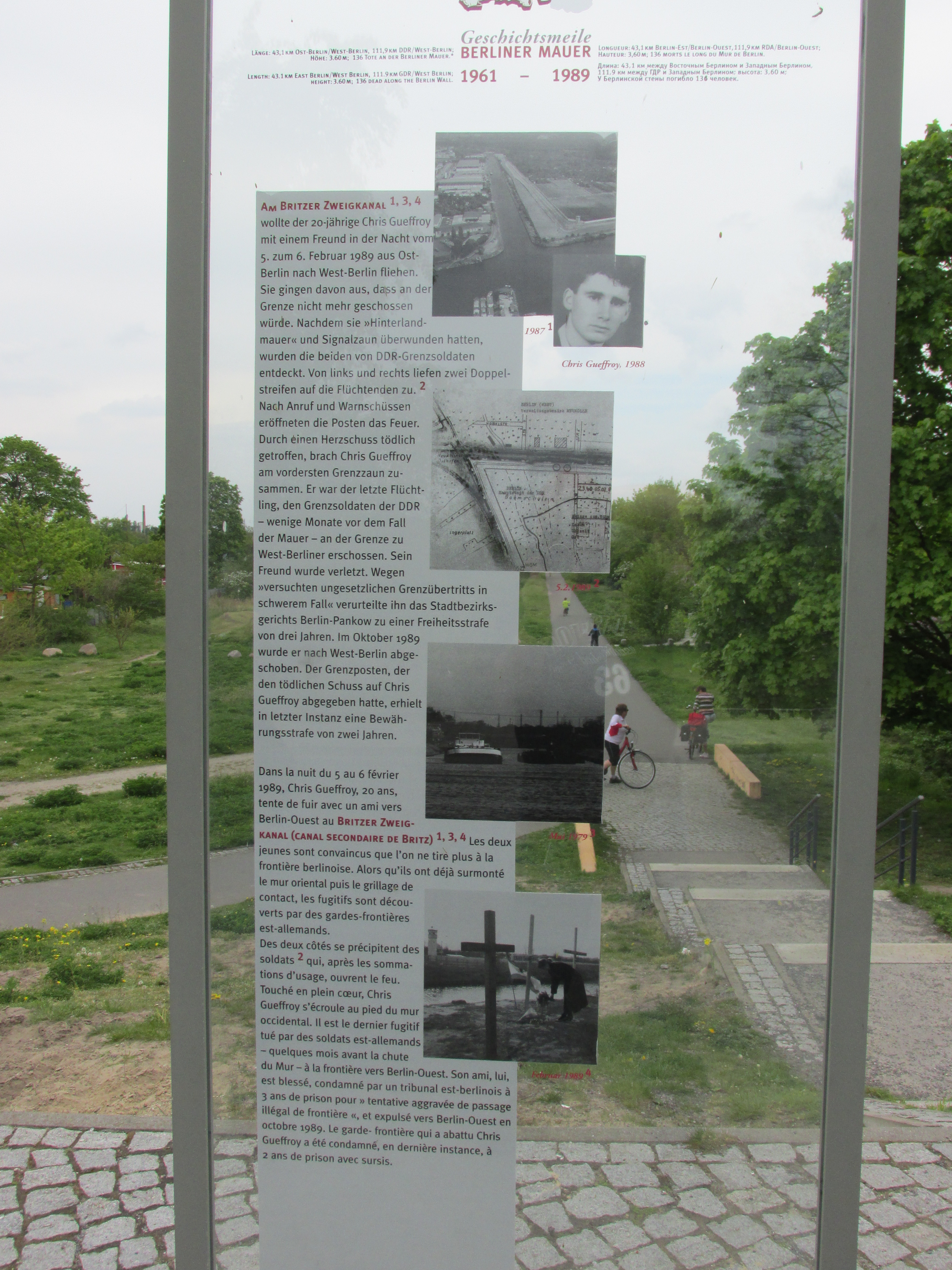
Berliner Mauerweg memorial to Chris Gueffroy, looking from Chris-Gueffroy-Allee, a few hundred meters from where he attempted his escape in 1989.

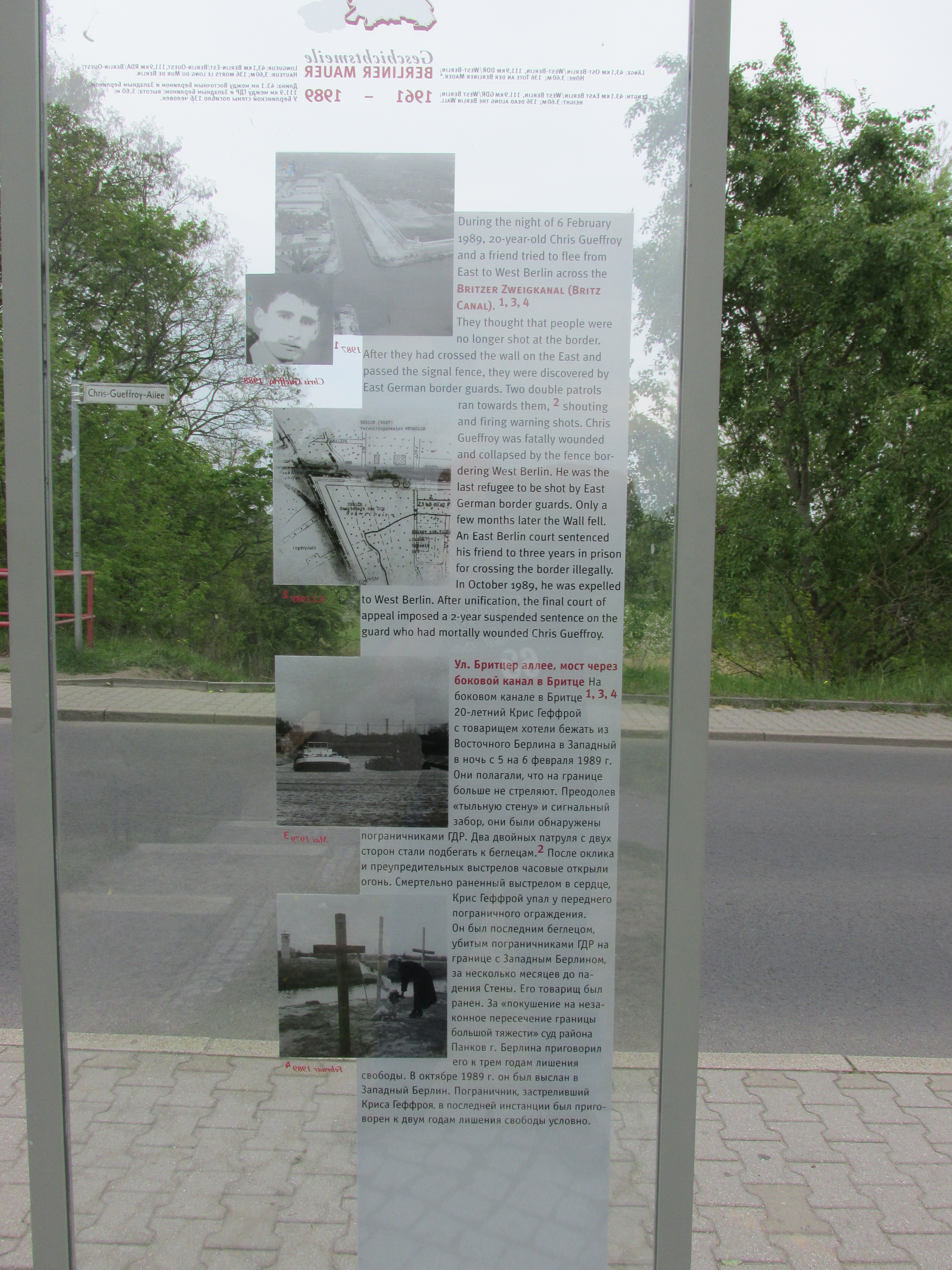
Berliner Mauerweg memorial to Chris Gueffroy, looking towards Chris-Gueffroy-Allee, a few hundred meters from where he attempted his escape in 1989.

== See also ==
- Sven Hüber
- List of deaths at the Berlin Wall
- Berlin Crisis of 1961
