= Wolfgang Huber =

Wolfgang Huber may refer to:

- Wolfgang Huber (physician) (born 1940), German physician
- Wolfgang Huber (scientist), German computational biologist
- Wolfgang Huber (theologian) (born 1942), German theologian, ethicist and former bishop

== See also ==
- Wolfgang Huber (born 1935), founder of Socialist Patients' Collective
