= Rupert Huber =

Rupert Huber may refer to:

- Rupert Huber (composer), Austrian composer and musician
- Rupert Huber (physicist), German physicist
