= Christian Hübner =

German operatic bass

Christian Hübner (born 1977) is a German operatic bass.

== Life ==
Christian Hübner was born in Regensburg, Germany. After passing the Abitur at the Musikgymnasium der Regensburger Domspatzen, he first studied architecture at the Technical University of Munich. After a successful participation in the Jugend musiziert competition and a scholarship from the Salzburg Paul Hofhaymer Society, he studied singing at the Hochschule für Musik und Tanz Köln in 2001. He graduated in 2007.

From 2007 to 2009, Hübner was a permanent member of the ensemble of the Staatstheater am Gärtnerplatz in Munich, and from then until 2011 of the Theater Bremen. Since then, he has worked freelance. His repertoire includes among others Sarastro in Die Zauberflöte, Commendatore in Don Giovanni, Fafner, Fasolt, Hunding and Hagen in Der Ring des Nibelungen, Rocco in Fidelio, King Marke in Tristan und Isolde, Brighella in Das Liebesverbot and Baron Ochs in Der Rosenkavalier.

== Engagements ==
- Tokyo New National Theatre NNT (Fafner, Das Rheingold and Siegfried)
- Teatro Colón, Buenos Aires (Brighella, Das Liebesverbot)
- Filharmonia Narodowa, Warsaw (König Marke, Tristan und Isolde)
- Teatro de la Maestranza Sevilla (Hagen, Götterdämmerung)
- Teatro San Carlo, Neapel (Salome)
- Teatro Massimo, Palermo (Fafner, Das Rheingold)
- Maggio Musicale, Florenz (Rocco, Fidelio, as cover)
- Badisches Staatstheater Karlsruhe (Hagen, Götterdämmerung)
- Opéra Angers Nantes (Rocco, Fidelio)
- Opéra de Dijon (Fafner, Hunding, Hagen, Der Ring des Nibelungen)
- Opera Maastricht (Baron Ochs, Der Rosenkavalier)
- Taipeh Philharmonie (Bass, Verdi Requiem)
- Berlin Philharmonie (Bass, Verdi Requiem)
- Bremen Glocke (Bass, Haydn Die Jahreszeiten)
