= Jonathan Huber =

Jonathan Huber may refer to:

- Brodie Lee (1979–2020), American professional wrestler better known as Brodie Lee and Luke Harper
- Jon Huber (born 1981), American baseball pitcher

== See also ==
- John Huber (disambiguation)
