= Adam Humer =

Polish communist (1917–2001)

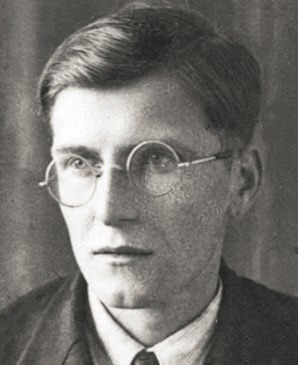
- Colonel Adam Humer
- Born: Adam Teofil Umer; 27 April 1917; Camden, New Jersey, United States
- Died: 12 November 2001 (aged 84); Warsaw, Poland
- Occupation: Interrogator
- Known for: Deputy Director of the Department of Investigation of Ministry of Public Security
- Awards: Two Silver Cross of Merit

Adam Teofil Humer (27 April 1917 – 12 November 2001) was a Polish communist activist and high-ranking official of the Ministry of Public Security of Poland (deputy director of Investigations Bureau).

== Biography ==
Humer was born into a Polish working-class family in the United States. His father who was a communist activist was killed by underground anti-communists partisans in 1946. He and his family returned to Poland in 1921 and Humer later joined the Communist Youth Union of Western Ukraine. During the Nazi invasion of Poland he remained in Tomaszów Lubelski. After the Soviet invasion of Poland in 1939 Humer and other activists of the Communist Youth Union created the Poviat Revolutionary Committee which he became its vice-chairman. After the Red Army withdrew and German–Soviet Frontier Treaty was signed Humer was evacuated to the Soviet occupation zone and entered the University of Lviv where he was engaged in propaganda and joined the Komsomol in 1941.

After the start of the German-Soviet War and the occupation of Lviv, Humer returned Tomaszów Lubelski and remained in hiding. With the entry of the Red Army in July 1944, he participated in the organization of local national councils in the local poviat on behalf of the Polish Committee of National Liberation. In the period from 13 August to 8 September 1944, he was the head of the Propaganda and Information Department at the County National Council in Tomaszów Lubelski. After the war's end, Humer and his brother Edward, particularly threatened by attacks under the sentence of the Polish Underground State, were moved to Lublin, and soon to Warsaw. Adam ended up in the Ministry of Public Security and his brother was sent to work in the Main Directorate of Military Information.

An officer of the Ministry of Public Security in the People's Republic of Poland he was in the Department of Public Security from 12 September 1944 (including head of the Investigative Section of WUBP in Lublin, from 15 February 1945, head of Section VIII of Division I, from 31 August 1945, deputy head of Department VII of Department I of the Ministry of Public Security, from 16 September 1945, deputy head of Department IV) Independent MBP, from 1 July 1947, deputy director, at the same time head of the II Department of the Investigation Department of the Ministry of Public Security, from 1 September 1951, deputy director of the Investigation Department of the Ministry of Public Security). He actively participated in the suppression of the Polish anti-communist underground. Humer participated in the trial of Witold Pilecki, confirmed the indictment, on the basis of which Pilecki was executed.

In March 1955, during the beginning of de-Stalinization, Humer was removed from office. His methods were qualified as "unlawful" by a special commission of the Politburo of the Polish United Workers' Party Central Committee. From the security forces, Humer had to move to a secondary position in the Ministry of Agriculture. He was not stripped of his military rank and retained the previously received award, Silver Cross of Merit.

Arrested in 1994, in March 1996 he and 11 other functionaries of the UB were convicted as Poland's first post-independence Stalinist criminals for their role in the routine torture and execution of members of the Polish Underground Resistance during the Stalinist era. Sentenced to nine years in prison, he died during a break in sentence.
