= Alfred Huber (footballer) =

German footballer

Personal information
- Date of birth: 29 January 1910
- Date of death: 25 January 1986 (aged 75)
- Position: Forward

Senior career*
Years	Team	Apps	(Gls)
- FC Rastatt 04

International career
1930	Germany	1	(0)
- * Club domestic league appearances and goals

Alfred Huber (29 January 1910 – 25 January 1986) was a German international footballer.
