= Thomas Huber (disambiguation) =

Thomas Huber (born 1966) is a German climber and mountaineer.

Thomas Huber may also refer to:

- Thomas Huber (artist) (born 1955), Swiss artist
- Thomas Huber (water polo) (born 1963), German water polo player

== See also ==
- Thomas Hubert Stinson (1883–1965), member of the Canadian House of Commons
