= Hans Huber =

Hans Huber may refer to:

- Hans Huber (boxer) (1934–2024), German boxer
- Hans Huber (composer) (1852–1921), Swiss composer
- Hans Huber (handballer) (born 1951), Swiss handball player
- Hans Huber (ice hockey) (1929–2014), German ice hockey player
- Max Huber (statesman) (Hans Max Huber, 1874–1960), Swiss judge and president of the Permanent Court of International Justice
