= Emil Hübner =

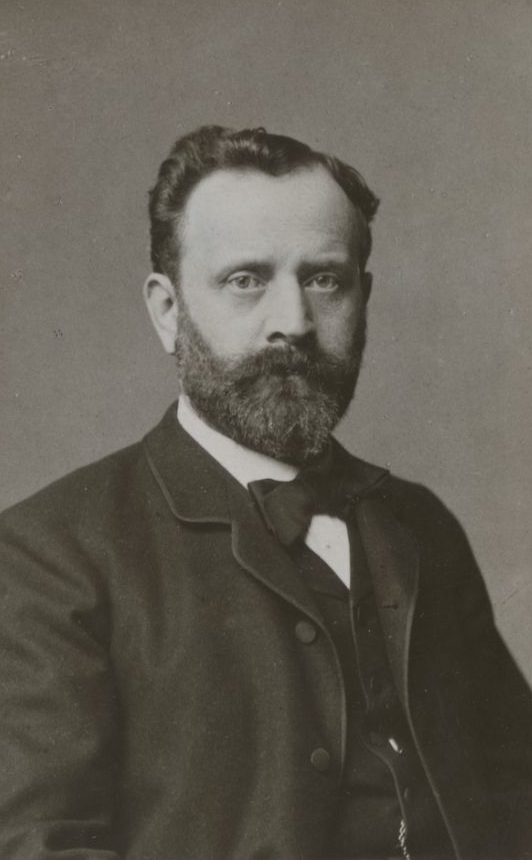
- Born: Ernst Willibald Emil Hübner; 7 July 1834; Düsseldorf, Kingdom of Prussia, German Confederation
- Died: 21 February 1901 (aged 66); Berlin, Kingdom of Prussia, German Empire

Academic background
- Education: University of Berlin; University of Bonn

Ernst Willibald Emil Hübner (7 July 1834 – 21 February 1901) was a German classical scholar.

He was born at Düsseldorf, the son of the historical painter Julius Hübner (1806–1882). After studying at Berlin and Bonn, he traveled extensively with a view to antiquarian and epigraphical researches. The results of these travels were published in several important works: Inscriptiones Hispaniae Latinae (1869, supplement 1892), Inscriptiones Hispaniae Christianae (1871, supplement 1900); Inscriptiones Britanniae Latinae (1873), Inscriptiones Britanniae Christianae (1876); La Arqueologia de Espana (1888); Monumenta Linguae Ibericae (1893).

Hübner also wrote two books for the classical student: Grundriss zu Vorlesungen über die römische Litteraturgeschichte (4th edition, 1878, edited, with large additions, by JEB Mayor as Bibliographical clue to Latin literature, 1875), and Bibliographie der klassischen Alterthumswissenschaft (2nd edition, 1889). He was also author of Römische Epigraphik (2nd edition, 1892); Exempla Scripturae Epigraphicae Latinae (1885); and Römische Herrschaft in Westeuropa (1890).

In 1870 Hübner was appointed professor of classical philology at the University of Berlin, where he died.
