= Jessica Huber =

American speech scientist

Academic background
- Education: BA, English, 1992, St. John Fisher College; MA, Speech/Lang Pathology, 1997, PhD, Speech Science, 2001, University at Buffalo
- Thesis: Respiratory and laryngeal responses to an oral air pressure bleed during speech (2001)

Jessica Eugenie Huber is an American speech scientist. She is a Professor of speech, language and hearing sciences and College of Health and Human Sciences associate dean for research at Purdue University.

== Early life and education ==
Huber completed her Bachelor of Arts degree in English at St. John Fisher College in 1992 before enrolling at the University at Buffalo for her graduate degrees. Prior to graduating with her PhD in 2001, Huber was included in the "Marquis Who's Who In American Universities And Colleges."

== Career ==
Following her PhD, Huber accepted a faculty position at Purdue University's Department of Speech, Language and Hearing Sciences in fall 2001. Upon joining the faculty, she focused her research on studying vocal changes associated with Parkinson's disease in order to develop more success therapies. As an associate professor in 2009, Huber created a voice-activated device that integrated a voice-detection sensor. The device automatically plays the background babble when the participant begins to speak in order to get them to increase their voice volume and speak more clearly. Following this development, Huber was named the 2012–13 faculty entrepreneur-in-residence at Discovery Park's Burton D. Morgan Center for Entrepreneurship. At the same time, her device was coined SpeechVive and she was working with the Purdue Research Foundation to bring it to the open market.

Upon completing her faculty entrepreneur-in-residence, Huber became the chief technology officer of SpeechVive Inc and made SpeechVive available throughout the United States. In 2014, she was named the recipient of the Outstanding Commercialization Award for Purdue University Faculty and a Faculty Fellow for Entrepreneurship. In 2016, Huber was appointed the interim associate vice provost for faculty affairs. In this role, she collaborated with colleague Jeff Haddad to study how playing specially created games could improve a patient's movement, speech, and overall quality of life. Following the 2018–19 academic year, Huber succeeded Dorothy Teegarden as the associate dean for research in the College of Health and Human Sciences. While serving in this new role, Huber continued to co-direct the Center for Research on Brain, Behavior, and NeuroRehabilitation and was elected a fellow of the National Academy of Inventors for her creation of SpeechVive.

During the COVID-19 pandemic, Huber focused on making SpeechVive more freely accessible to Americans. In July 2020, SpeechVive was issued a new Level II Healthcare Common Procedure Coding System code to streamline the processing of claims with government and commercial insurers. She later made SpeechVive's remote calibration software and training available free in order to make it more accessible for speech-language pathologists and their patients. In fall 2020, Huber earned a one-year grant to "jumpstart small-scale research projects that address outcomes and mitigate risks resulting from the pandemic."
