= Michael Huber (priest) =

Michael Huber, ca. 1893

Michael Huber (5 July 1841 – 14 March 1911) was a Bavarian Catholic priest and politician of the Centre Party. As a priest, he served as a military chaplain, confessor, parish priest, and member of the Cathedral Chapter of Regensburg. As a politician, he served one electoral period in the Reichstag and two electoral periods in the Kammer der Abgeordneten of Bavaria.

== Life and church career ==
Huber was born on 5 July 1841 in Amberg. After graduating from the gymnasium in Amberg, he studied Catholic theology at the Ludwig-Maximilians-Universität München. He was further educated at the seminary in Regensburg and was ordained as a priest on 26 June 1864. He worked as a priest in Asenkofen near Neufahrn in Niederbayern and as military chaplain in Amberg and during the 1866 Austro-Prussian War. Huber also worked as father of confession for nuns, as institutional inspector in Niederviehbach, and from 1871 as parish priest in Rothenstadt. He became a member of the Cathedral chapter in Regensburg and received the title of Geistlicher Rat (Spiritual Councillor) from the bishop and the title of Domestic Prelate from the pope. He died on 14 March 1911 in Regensburg.

== Political career ==
For the Catholic Centre Party, Huber was a member of the Reichstag from 1874 to 1877. He was elected as representative of the Oberpfalz 5 electoral district (Neustadt an der Waldnaab) with 80.98% of the vote in the 1874 German federal election. From 1887 to 1899, Huber was a member of the Bavarian Kammer der Abgeordneten, where he served on the committee for finance. In his first electoral period, he represented the electoral district of Straubing, in the second period that of Stadtamhof.
