= Instituto Potosino de Investigación Científica y Tecnológica =

Instituto Potosino de Investigación Científica y Tecnológica, A.C.
- Type: Public
- Established: 24 November 2000
- Affiliations: CONACyT
- Director: Alejandro Femat Flores
- Location: San Luis Potosí, Mexico; 22°08′57″N 101°02′04″W
- Colors: Blue and White
- Nickname: IPICyT
- Website: www.ipicyt.edu.mx

Instituto Potosino de Investigación Científica y Tecnológica, A.C. (IPICyT, and in English: San Luis Potosí Institute of Scientific Research and Technology) is one of 26 Public Research Centers in Mexico, funded by CONACyT. It was founded on Nov. 24, 2000.

It is divided into five academic departments: Nanoscience and Materials, Control and Dynamical Systems, Environmental Science, Applied Geosciences and Molecular Biology.

It also houses the Centro Nacional de Supercómputo de los Centros CONACyT (National Supercomputing Center for CONACyT).
