= Blanche Huber =

Maltese physician

- Born: c. 1900; Birkirkara, Malta
- Died: 19 July 1940 (aged 40)
- Education: University of Malta
- Occupations: Physician, pharmacist
- Known for: First female doctor in Malta
- Spouse: Joseph Caruana

Blanche Huber (c. 1900 – 1940) was the first woman in Malta to train as a doctor. She graduated as a doctor from the University of Malta in 1925, having entered it in 1919. However, Huber never worked as a doctor, instead she always practiced as a pharmacist in Żejtun.

== Life ==
Blanche Huber was born in Birkirkara to Hon Joseph Huber, and she later married Dr. Joseph Caruana, a fellow medical professional.

Huber matriculated in June 1919. In October 1919, she and Tessie Camilleri were the first female students to enrol at the University of Malta. Huber chose to enrol in the longer medicine course, and Camilleri, a literature student, graduated ahead of her in 1922.

She graduated as a doctor from the University of Malta in 1925. However, Huber never worked as a doctor; instead, she practiced as a pharmacist in Żejtun.

== Death and legacy ==
Huber died on 19 July 1940 at the age of 40.

Blanche Huber Street in Sliema is named after her.
