= Ludwig Huber =

Ludwig Huber may refer to:

- Ludwig Huber (biologist) (born 1964), professor and cognitive biologist at the University of Vienna
- Ludwig Ferdinand Huber (1764–1804), German author
