= Max Huber =

Max Huber may refer to:

- Max Huber (Canadian football) (1945–2018), American football player in the Canadian Football League
- Max Huber (graphic designer) (1919–1992), Swiss graphic designer
- Max Huber (statesman) (1874–1960), Swiss lawyer and diplomat
