= Hübener =

Hübener may refer to:

- Helmuth Hübener (1925–1942), a German Latter-day Saint and Nazi resister, and the youngest opponent of the Third Reich sentenced to death by the Volksgerichtshof
- Erhard Hübener (1881–1958), an East German politician
- Thomas Hübener (born 1982), a German footballer
