= Wilhelm Huber (disambiguation) =

Topics referred to by the same term

Wilhelm Huber may refer to:

- Willie Huber (1958–2010), German born professional ice hockey defenceman
- Willy Huber (1913–1998), Swiss football goalkeeper
