= Karolina Hübner =

American philosopher

- Awards: JHU's annual award

Education
- Education: Williams College (BA) University of Warwick (MA), University of Chicago (PhD)
- Thesis: Spinoza’s Causal Metaphysics (2010)
- Doctoral advisor: Yitzhak Melamed
- Other advisors: Steven Nadler, Charles Larmore, Arnold Davidson

Philosophical work
- Era: Contemporary philosophy
- Region: Western philosophy
- Institutions: University of Toronto; Cornell University
- Main interests: Early modern philosophy, philosophy of mind
- Website: https://www.karolinahubner.org/

Karolina Hübner is a philosopher and associate professor of Philosophy and Himan Brown Faculty Fellow at Cornell University. She is known for her works on Spinoza's thought. Hübner is a winner of The Journal of the History of Philosophy's annual award for her article “Representation and Mind-Body Identity in Spinoza’s Philosophy" (2022).

== Books ==
- Human: A History (ed.), Oxford University Press 2022
- Spinoza on Mind: Idealism and Intentionality (forthcoming)
- Cambridge Spinoza Lexicon, co-editor with Justin Steinberg (forthcoming, 2022)
