= Don Huber =

American soccer player

Personal information
- Full name: Donald Huber
- Date of birth: May 1, 1957 (age 69)
- Place of birth: St. Louis, Missouri, U.S.
- Position: Forward

College career
Years	Team	Apps	(Gls)
1975–1978	Saint Louis Billikens		

Senior career*
Years	Team	Apps	(Gls)
1979	Minnesota Kicks	1	(0)
1979–1980	Tulsa Roughnecks	3	(0)
1980–1981	Baltimore Blast (indoor)	6	(0)
1982–1988	St. Louis Kutis		
- * Club domestic league appearances and goals

Don Huber (born May 1, 1957) is an American retired soccer forward who played professionally in the North American Soccer League and Major Indoor Soccer League. He also played for St. Louis Kutis S.C. when it won the 1986 National Challenge Cup.

Huber attended St. Louis University where he played on the men's soccer team from 1975 to 1978. He was a 1978 Honorable Mention (third team) All American. He was inducted into the school's Athletic Hall of Fame in 1995. In 1979, he began his professional career with the Minnesota Kicks of the North American Soccer League. He then moved to the Tulsa Roughnecks. In the Fall of 1980, he signed with the Baltimore Blast of the Major Indoor Soccer League. He retired from professional soccer at the end of the season and returne to St. Louis where he joined St. Louis Kutis S.C. In 1986, Huber and his teammates won the National Challenge Cup.

He was inducted into the St. Louis Soccer Hall of Fame in 2009.
