= Charles Huber =

Charles Huber may refer to:

- Charles E. Huber (1845–1904), Los Angeles City Council member
- Charles M. Huber (born 1956), German politician and actor
- Chuck Huber (born 1971), American voice actor
