= Fritz Huber =

Fritz Huber may refer to:

- Fritz Huber (astronomer) (1958–2015), German amateur astronomer
- Fritz Huber (engineer) (1881–1942), German mechanical engineer
- Fritz Huber (wrestler) (born 1949), German Olympic wrestler

== See also ==
- Asteroid 436048 Fritzhuber, named after the astronomer
