= Johann Huber =

Johann Huber may refer to:

- Johann Jakob Huber (1733–1798), Swiss astronomer
- Johann Nepomuk Huber (1830–1879), German philosopher
- Johann Rudolf Huber (1668–1748), Swiss painter
