= Marcia Huber =

American chemical engineer

- Education: University of Pittsburgh (BS); Colorado School of Mines (PhD)
- Awards: Department of Commerce Bronze Medal (2005)
- Scientific career
- Fields: Thermophysics, chemical engineering
- Institutions: National Institute of Standards and Technology
- Thesis: An investigation of heat transfer in packed beds at high temperatures and low Reynolds numbers
- Doctoral advisor: M. C. Jones

Marcia Lynn Huber is an American chemical engineer. She is a researcher at the National Institute of Standards and Technology. Huber's research interests include developing models for the thermophysical properties of fluids. She was awarded the Department of Commerce Bronze Medal in 2005.

== Education ==
Huber received a B.S. in chemical engineering at the University of Pittsburgh, and a Ph.D. in chemical and petroleum refining engineering at the Colorado School of Mines after a brief stint working for Rockwell International. Her 1985 dissertation is titled An investigation of heat transfer in packed beds at high temperatures and low Reynold's numbers. Huber's doctoral advisor was M. C. Jones.

== Career ==
After graduating with her Ph.D. from the Colorado School of Mines Huber began working at the NIST as a National Research Council (NRC) postdoctoral research fellow working with James Ely. Her post-doc focused on developing extended corresponding states models for the properties of fluids, especially heavy hydrocarbons. This work was expanded and incorporated into several early computer databases for thermophysical properties, including what is now NIST Database 23, more commonly called REFPROP.

Huber is currently a chemical engineer at the National Institute of Standards and Technology, and is active in organizing the International Symposium on Thermophysical Properties, held triennially in Boulder, Colorado, US. Previous positions held by Huber at NIST include being the group leader of the Theory and Modelling of Fluids Group.

=== Research ===
Huber has been the author or co-author of over 110 research papers, 19 patents, and has been cited over 12,900 times.

Modeling the thermophysical properties of fluids

Huber is interested in many aspects of developing models for the thermophysical properties of fluids. She often is involved with international collaborations to develop reference fluid correlations for the viscosity and thermal conductivity of many industrially important pure fluids such as carbon dioxide and water. Most recently she has focused on proposed low-GWP replacement refrigerants such as R1234yf and R1233zd(E). She also is interested in developing surrogate mixture models for the thermodynamic and transport properties of complex fuel mixtures, including aviation and transport fuels. Recent work has focused on low-sulfur diesel fuels, past research included biofuels, rocket propellants, and aviation fuels. Other interests include the solid-liquid boundary of fluids, fire-suppressant mixtures, surface tension, and development of mixture models for thermophysical properties. She also is part of the team that continuously works on developing and improving the REFPROP program.

== Awards and honors ==
Huber received the NIST Standard Reference Data Measurement Services Award twice, first in 1992 and again in 1995. She was awarded the Department of Commerce Bronze Medal in 2005.
