= Robert Huber (disambiguation) =

Robert Huber (born 1937) is a German biochemist.

Robert Huber may also refer to:

- Robert Huber (engineer) (1901–1995), Swiss engineer
- Robert Huber (footballer) (born 1975), Swiss footballer
- Robert Huber (rower) (1906–1942), German Olympic rower
- Robert Huber (sport shooter) (1878–1946), Finnish sport shooter
- Robert J. Huber (1922–2001), American politician and businessman
- Robert T. Huber (1920–1991), American politician
