= Rod Huber =

American football coach (born c. 1960–1961)

Biographical details
- Born: c. 1960 or 1961 (age 65–66); Glen Este, Ohio, U.S.
- Education: University of Cincinnati; Mount St. Joseph University

Playing career
- Position: Guard

Coaching career (HC unless noted)
- 1990–1999: Mount St. Joseph (assistant)
- 2000–2016: Mount St. Joseph

Head coaching record
- Overall: 106–69
- Tournaments: 0–5 (NCAA D-III playoffs)

Accomplishments and honors

Championships
- 4 HCAC (2004–2006, 2009)

Awards
- Mount St. Joseph Hall of Fame (2023)

Rod Huber (born c. 1960 or 1961) is an American former college football coach. He was the head football coach for Mount St. Joseph University from 2000 to 2016. He was a member of the team since its inception in 1990. He was inducted into the Mount St. Joseph Hall of Fame in 2023.

== Personal life ==
From 1979 to 1982, Huber served in the United States Army. In 2004, his son died.

== Head coaching record ==
Year	Team	Overall	Conference	Standing	Bowl/playoffs
Mount St. Joseph Lions (Heartland Collegiate Athletic Conference) (2000–2016)
2000	Mount St. Joseph	2–8	0–6	7th	
2001	Mount St. Joseph	0–10	0–6	7th	
2002	Mount St. Joseph	5–5	4–2	3rd	
2003	Mount St. Joseph	6–4	4–2	3rd	
2004	Mount St. Joseph	10–1	6–0	1st	L NCAA Division III First Round
2005	Mount St. Joseph	9–2	5–1	1st	L NCAA Division III First Round
2006	Mount St. Joseph	9–2	7–0	1st	L NCAA Division III First Round
2007	Mount St. Joseph	9–2	6–1	2nd	L NCAA Division III First Round
2008	Mount St. Joseph	5–5	3–4	T–5th	
2009	Mount St. Joseph	9–2	7–0	1st	L NCAA Division III First Round
2010	Mount St. Joseph	5–5	4–4	5th	
2011	Mount St. Joseph	6–4	5–3	T–2nd	
2012	Mount St. Joseph	4–6	3–5	6th	
2013	Mount St. Joseph	6–4	6–2	2nd	
2014	Mount St. Joseph	8–2	7–1	2nd	
2015	Mount St. Joseph	7–3	6–2	T–2nd	
2016	Mount St. Joseph	6–4	6–2	3rd	
Mount St. Joseph:		106–69	79–41		
Total:		106–69			
National championship Conference title Conference division title or championship game berth
