= Xavier Joseph Huber =

American cyclist (1864–1944)

Xavier Joseph Huber (1864–1944) was a Swiss-born cyclist who won 60 medals and trophies in that country.

== Life ==
Huber, born in Switzerland in 1864, "won recognition in his country for bicycle riding and during his career he won 60 medals and trophies in various competitions."

He moved to the Spokane, Washington area before the great fire of August 4, 1889.

"For many years Mr. Huber was engineer in the Desert hotel and later he landscaped some of Spokane's finest homes."

Huber died at home on Friday, January 21, 1944. He was survived by his widow, the former Anna Bittrick, and a large family, at S. 521 Arthur Street, Spokane. The body was handled by Ball & Dodd Funeral Home.
