= Thaddäus Huber =

Austrian musician (1742–1798)

Thaddäus Huber (8 May 1742 – 27 February 1798) was an Austrian violinist and composer.

== Life ==
Huber was born in Niederhollabrunn in Lower Austria; his father was a farmer and amateur violinist. With musical ability, he joined the choir of Klosterneuburg Monastery at the age of ten. He later went to Vienna, where he attended the Jesuit seminary and was a member of the boys' choir at the Hofkapelle. He entered Viktring Abbey, where he took over church music. For health reasons, he returned to Vienna and, encouraged by his father, he renounced his status as a cleric.

In Vienna, he became a violinist in the court theatre. For many years, he was a violinist at the Schottenkirche. He was a founder member in 1771 of the Tonkünstler-Societät and was secretary of the society for several years. In 1789, he became the first violinist in the Hofkapelle.

Joseph Haydn highly regarded his compositions, and his string quartets were played in the afternoon chamber music gatherings of Emperor Joseph II.

Huber died in Vienna in 1798; Gottfried van Swieten bought his musical estate.

== Works ==
Huber's compositions include symphonies, string quartets, divertimenti and string trios.
