= John Huber (disambiguation) =

John Huber or may refer to:

- John Huber (baseball) (1908–1964), American Negro league pitcher
- John D. Huber, American political scientist
- John W. Huber (born 1967), American attorney

== See also ==
- Jonathan Huber
