= Hueber =

Hueber is a surname. Notable people with the surname include:

- Aubin Hueber (born 1967), former French rugby union footballer and a current coach
- Charles Hueber (1883–1943), Alsatian politician
- Fortunatus Hueber (1639–1706), West German Franciscan historian and theologian
- Joseph Hueber (1715 or 1717–1787), Austrian baroque master builder
- Maria Hueber (1653–1705), Catholic nun, teacher and foundress
- Maxime Hueber-Moosbrugger (born 1996), French duathlete and triathlete

== See also ==
- Hüber (German-language surname)
- Huber (German-language surname)
