= Wolfgang Huber (physician) =

German specialist in internal medicine, nephrologist and environmental medicine

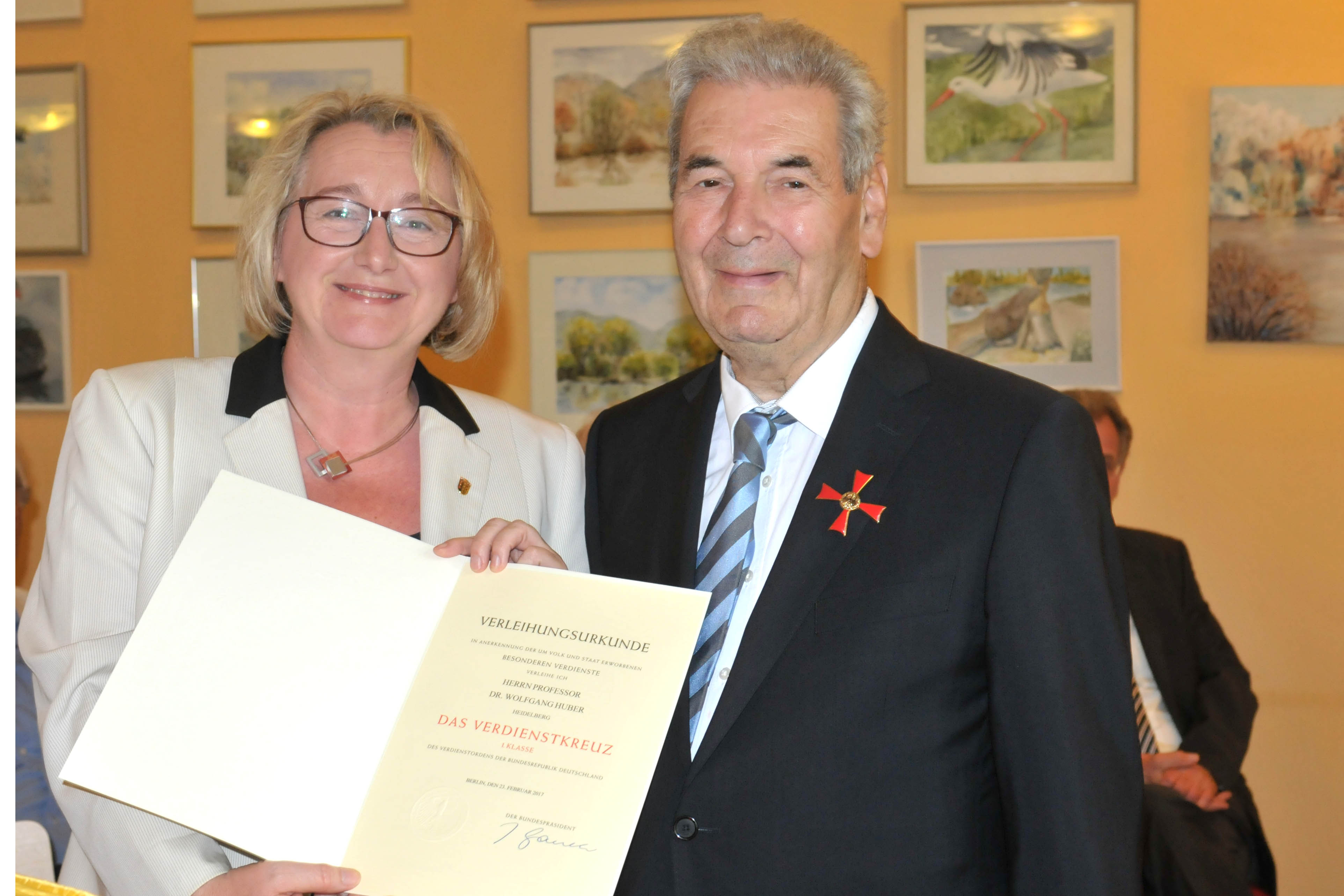
Science Minister Theresia Bauer presents Wolfgang Huber with the Federal Cross of Merit, 1st Class.

Wolfgang Huber (born 11 November 1940 in Mannheim) is a German specialist in internal medicine, nephrology, and environmental medicine.

== Biography ==
After completing his medical studies at Heidelberg University in 1965, Huber was assistant physician and research assistant at the University Hospital Mannheim, belonging to the University of Heidelberg, from 1967 to 1975. In 1974, he received his licence to become a specialist in internal medicine, and in 1976, he was awarded the teaching licence ("Venia Legendi") for this subject. From 1975 to 1998, Huber worked as a senior physician in the hospital "SRH Kurpfalzkrankenhaus Heidelberg" in the Nephrology/Hemodialysis department. The sub-area designation "nephrologist" was recognized in 1979. From 1986 to 2005 Huber was adjunct professor at Heidelberg University Faculty of Medicine in Mannheim.

In a report on Frankfurt wood preservative processes, Huber proposed a connection between biocidal constituents of various wood preservatives and immune disorders.

From 1995 onwards, Huber was given the additional title of “environmental medicine”, and from 1998 to February 2021, he ran a private practice in Wieblingen, a district of Heidelberg. As a reviewer, he prepared reports in pension and occupational disease procedures, vaccination reports, reports in severely disabled persons, law procedures and private reports until 2017.

In 2000, he was awarded the Federal Cross of Merit on ribbon, in 2008 with the citizen's badge of the city of Heidelberg and in 2017 with the Federal Cross of Merit 1st class for his decades of commitment to environmental medicine and senior citizen work.

== Publications (selection) ==
Huber published over 130 publications, including a small selection below:

- Handbuch der Arbeitsmedizin: Arbeitsphysiologie, Arbeitspsychologie, klinische Arbeitsmedizin, Prävention und Gesundheitsförderung (in German), Heidelberg München Landsberg Frechen Hamburg: ecomed Medizin, 1989
- Daniel, Volker; Huber, Wolfgang; Bauer, Klausdieter; Suesal, Caner; Mytilineos, Joannis; Melk, Anette; Conradt, Christian; Opelz, Gerhard (2001). "Association of Elevated Blood Levels of Pentachlorophenol (PCP) with Cellular and Humoral Immunodeficiencies". Archives of Environmental Health. 56 (1): 77–83. doi:10.1080/00039890109604057. ISSN 0003-9896. PMID 11256860. S2CID 8560862.
- Wolfgang Huber und Volker von Baehr, umwelt medizin gesellschaft (ed.), Die Behandlung der sekundären Mitochondriopathie - Therapiemonitoring mit den Labormarkern Adenosintriphosphat (ATP) und dem Entzündungsmarker TNF-alpha, 2/2012 (in German)
- Wolfgang Huber und Volker von Baehr, umwelt medizin gesellschaft (ed.), Chronische Systemische Entzündungserkrankungen – eine standardisierte Diagnostik führt zur zielgerichteten Therapie, 4/2014 (in German)
- Wolfgang Huber und Volker von Baehr, umwelt medizin gesellschaft (ed.), Chronische Entzündungen behandeln - Ergebnisse einer orthomolekularen Langzeittherapie, 1/2017 (in German)
- Hans-Ulrich Hill, Wolfgang Huber, Kurt E. Müller (2010), Multiple Chemikalien-Sensitivität (MCS): ein Krankheitsbild der chronischen Multisystemerkrankungen (CMI) ; umweltmedizinische, toxikologische und sozialpolitische Aspekte ; ein Blick auf den aktuellen Forschungsstand, Berichte aus der Medizin (in German) (3., neu bearb. und erw. Aufl ed.), Aachen: Shaker, ISBN 978-3-8322-9046-7
- Ulf Claussen, Wolfgang Huber (1987), Wenn Arbeit das Leben kostet: stimmt d. Gesundheitsschutz im Betrieb?, SWI zum Thema Nr. 5 : Arbeitsschutz (in German), Bochum: SWI-Verl, ISBN 3-925895-07-8
