= Alexander Huber (disambiguation) =

Alexander Huber (born 1968) was a German climber

Alexander Huber may also refer to:

- Alexander Huber (beach volleyball) (born 1985), Austrian beach volleyball player
- Alexander Huber (footballer) (born 1985), Tajikistani retired professional footballer
