= Peter Huber =

Peter Huber may refer to:

- Peter Huber (diplomat) (born 1967), Austrian diplomat
- Peter Huber (diver) (1930–2014), Austrian Olympic diver
- Peter J. Huber (born 1934), Swiss statistician
- Peter W. Huber (1952–2021), American lawyer
