= Patrick Huber =

German theoretical particle physicist

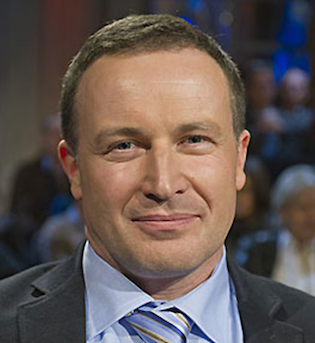
- Education: Technical University of Munich (Diplom, Dr. rer. nat.)
- Scientific career
- Workplaces: Virginia Tech; CERN; University of Wisconsin–Madison
- Thesis: Three Flavour Effects in Future Neutrino Oscillation Experiments (2003)

Patrick Huber is a German theoretical particle physicist known for his calculation of the reactor neutrino flux, and for his work in computing sensitivity of neutrino oscillation experiments and applications of reactor neutrino detection. He is a Professor of Physics Virginia Tech and Director of Virginia Tech's Center for Neutrino Physics. In 2016, he was honoured with the Breakthrough Prize in Fundamental Physics for his work on the Daya Bay Reactor Neutrino Experiment.

== Education and career ==
Huber studied at the Technical University of Munich, completing his diploma in 2000 and his Doctor rerum naturalium in theoretical physics in 2003, under the supervision of Manfred Lindner. After completing postdoctoral appointments at the University of Wisconsin–Madison and CERN, he started a faculty position in the Virginia Tech Physics Department in 2008, and received tenure in 2012. He became director of the Center for Neutrino Physics in 2017.

== Awards and honours ==
- 2010 DOE Early Career Researcher Award
- 2016 Breakthrough Prize in Fundamental Physics
- 2019 Fellow of the American Physical Society

== Select publications ==
- Huber, Patrick (29 August 2011). "On the determination of anti-neutrino spectra from nuclear reactors". Physical Review C. 84 024617. arXiv:1106.0687. doi:10.1103/PhysRevC.84.024617. S2CID 54993391.
- Huber, Patrick; Lindner, Manfred; Winter, Walter (1 August 2013). "Simulation of long-baseline neutrino oscillation experiments with GLoBES: (General Long Baseline Experiment Simulator)". Computer Physics Communications. 167 (3): 192–202. arXiv:hep-ph/0407333. doi:10.1016/j.cpc.2005.01.003. S2CID 14982349.
- Daya Bay Collaboration; An, F.P. (23 April 2012). "Observation of Electron-Antineutrino Disappearance at Daya Bay". Physical Review Letters. 108 (17) 171803. arXiv:1203.1669. Bibcode:2012PhRvL.108q1803A. doi:10.1103/PhysRevLett.108.171803. PMID 22680853. S2CID 16580300.
