= JoKarl Huber =

German artist

Joseph Karl Huber, stagename JoKarl Huber (* 13 February 1902, † 1996) was a German artist.

Born in 1902 in the Württembergian village of Laudenbach (now part of Weikersheim), Huber first studied law, but gave that up to become an artist in Munich. In 1938, he married fellow artist Hildegard Huber Sasse, and in 1942, the couple had a daughter, Ursula.

In the late 1930s, the minister of the Church of Saints Peter and Paul in Weil der Stadt, August Uhl, commissioned his childhood friend to create a stained-glass window commemorating the life of Christ. This was a politically brave request because in 1936, Huber's work had been labelled by the Nazis as "degenerate," although his work was not included in the infamous Entartete Kunst show in Munich in 1937. After working for two years on the project in Weil der Stadt, in 1940, Huber unveiled his new window, one panel of which shows the temptation scene from the gospel of Matthew, in which Satan offers all the realms of the world to Jesus, if he will only worship Satan. Satan bears the unmistakable features of Adolf Hitler. This window is considered Huber's masterwork.

In 1941, Huber served in the German army, was captured in 1944, and spent some time in a British prisoner-of-war camp. After the war, he returned to Munich, where he continued to work as an artist throughout the following decades, employing a variety of media, including glass, canvas, paper, bronze, and stone.
