= Julius Hübner =

German painter

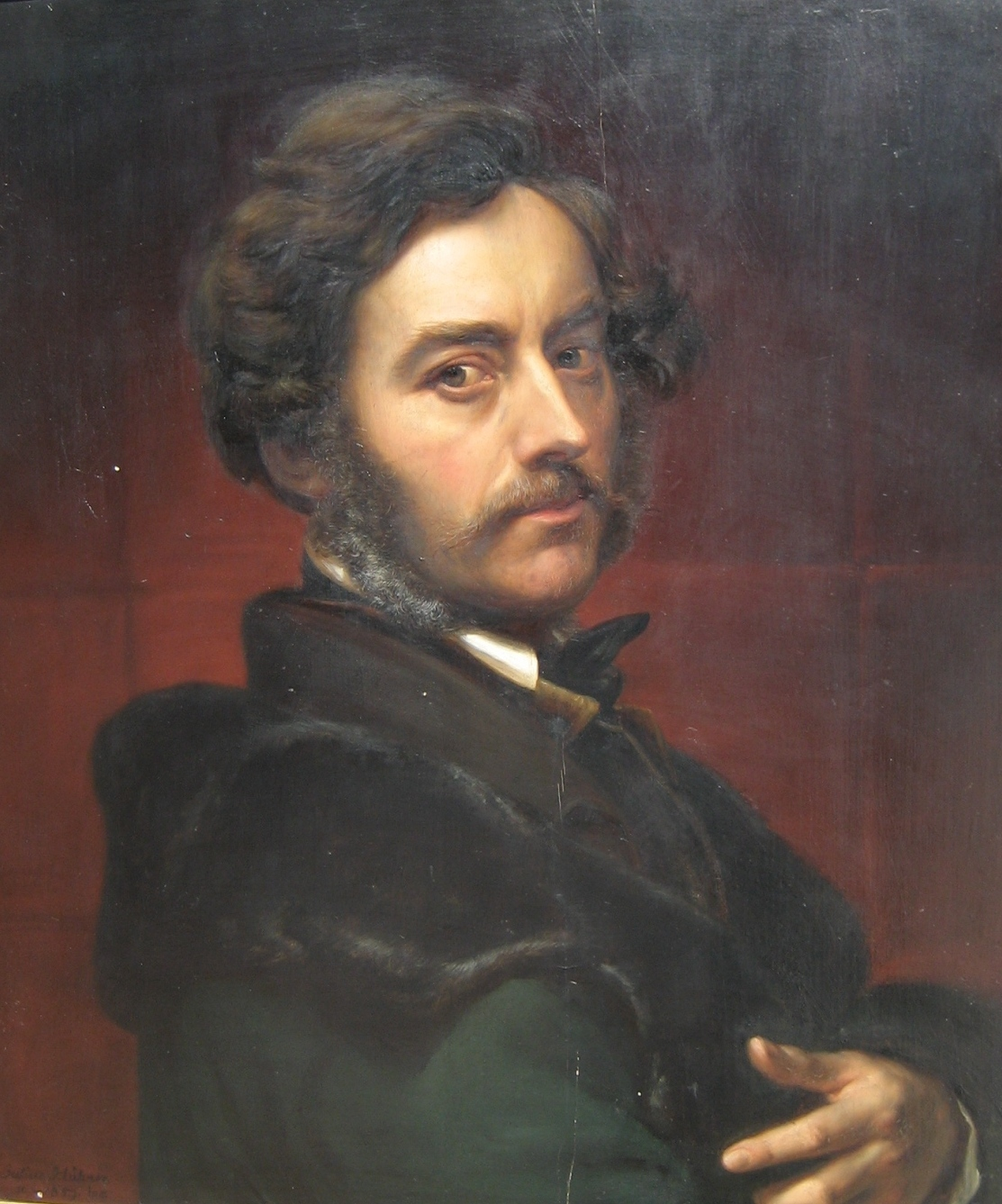
Self-portrait (1859)

Julius Hübner (27 January 1806 – 7 November 1882) was a German historical painter of the Düsseldorf school of painting. He was also known as a poet and the father of Emil Hübner, a distinguished classical scholar.

== Life ==
Hübner was born at Oels in Silesia, studied at the Prussian Academy of Arts in Berlin under Schadow, and in Düsseldorf. He first attracted attention by his picture of "Ruth and Boaz" (1825). He traveled in Italy and resided for the most part at Düsseldorf until 1839. In that year he settled at Dresden, becoming a professor in the Dresden Academy of Fine Arts in 1841 and director of the Gemäldegalerie Alte Meister in 1871. He oversaw the printing of the gallery catalogues and wrote a forward to the 1871 catalogue describing the history of the collection, which was published in English in 1876. He obtained the great gold medal at Brussels in 1851. He died in Loschwitz.

== Works ==
Among the works of Hübner's first period are The Fisherman (1828), after Goethe's ballad; Ruth and Naomi (1833), in the National Gallery, Berlin; Christ and the Four Evangelists (1835); Job and his Friends (1838), in the Gallery of Frankfurt; Consider the Lilies (1839); and the portrait of Frederick III, in Frankfurt's Römer.

To his second, or Dresden, period belong the Golden Age and Dispute between Luther and Dr. Eck (1866), in the Dresden Gallery; Charles V at San Yuste; Last Days of Frederick the Great; Cupid in Winter, and others.

== Gallery ==
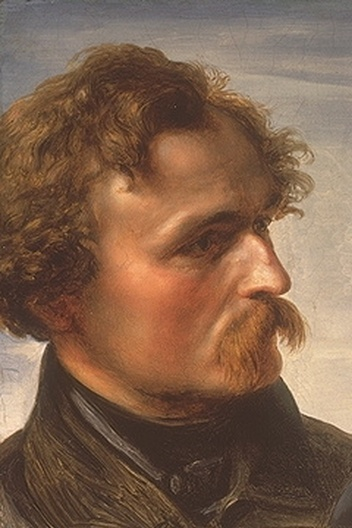
Carl Friedrich Lessing (detail)

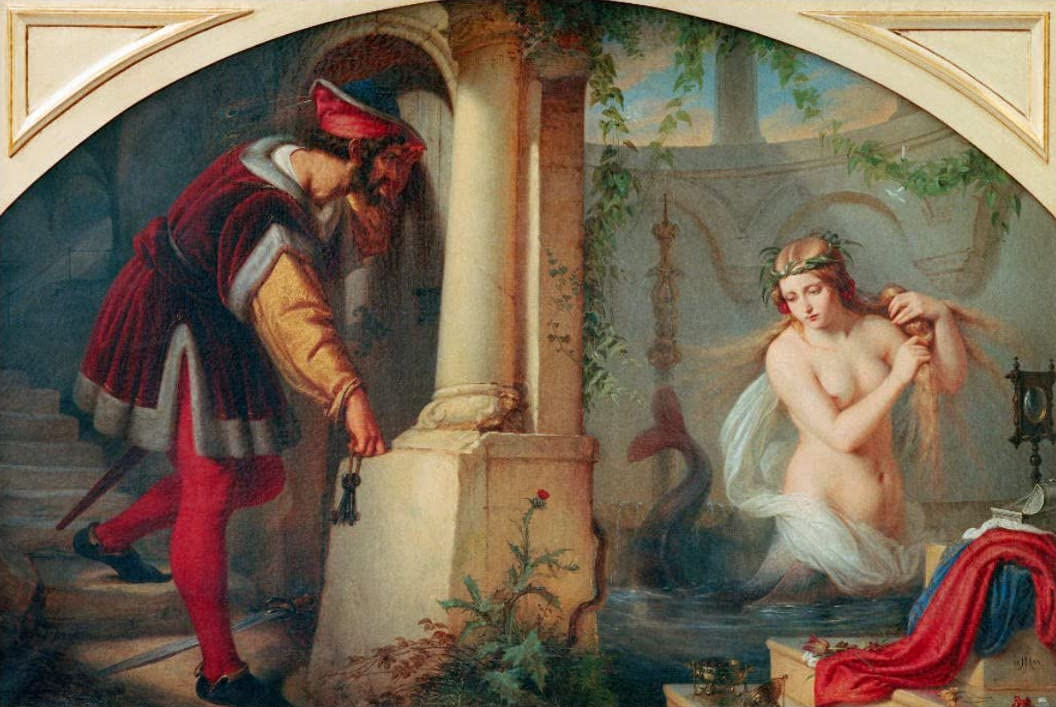
Melusine

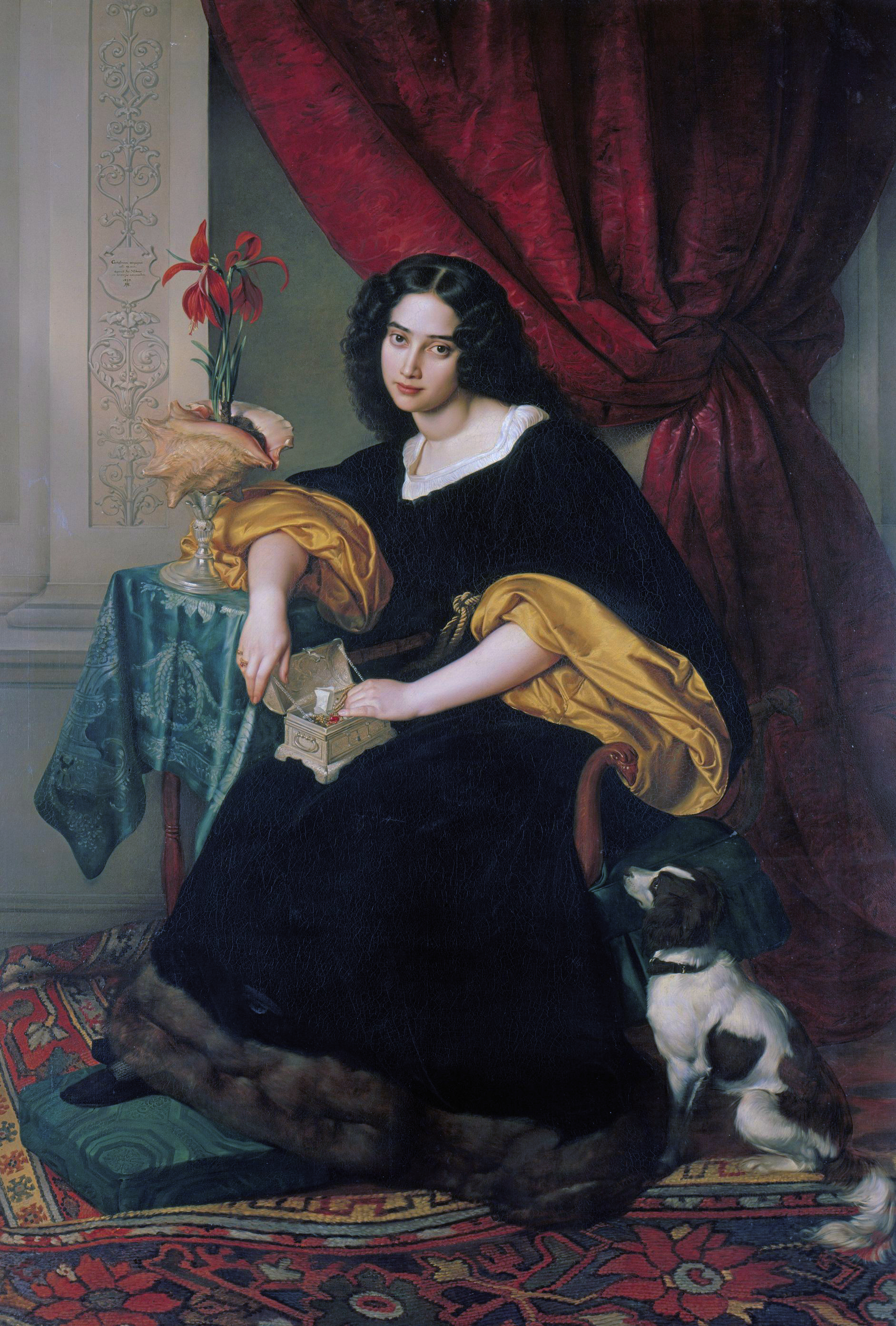
Portrait of his wife, Pauline

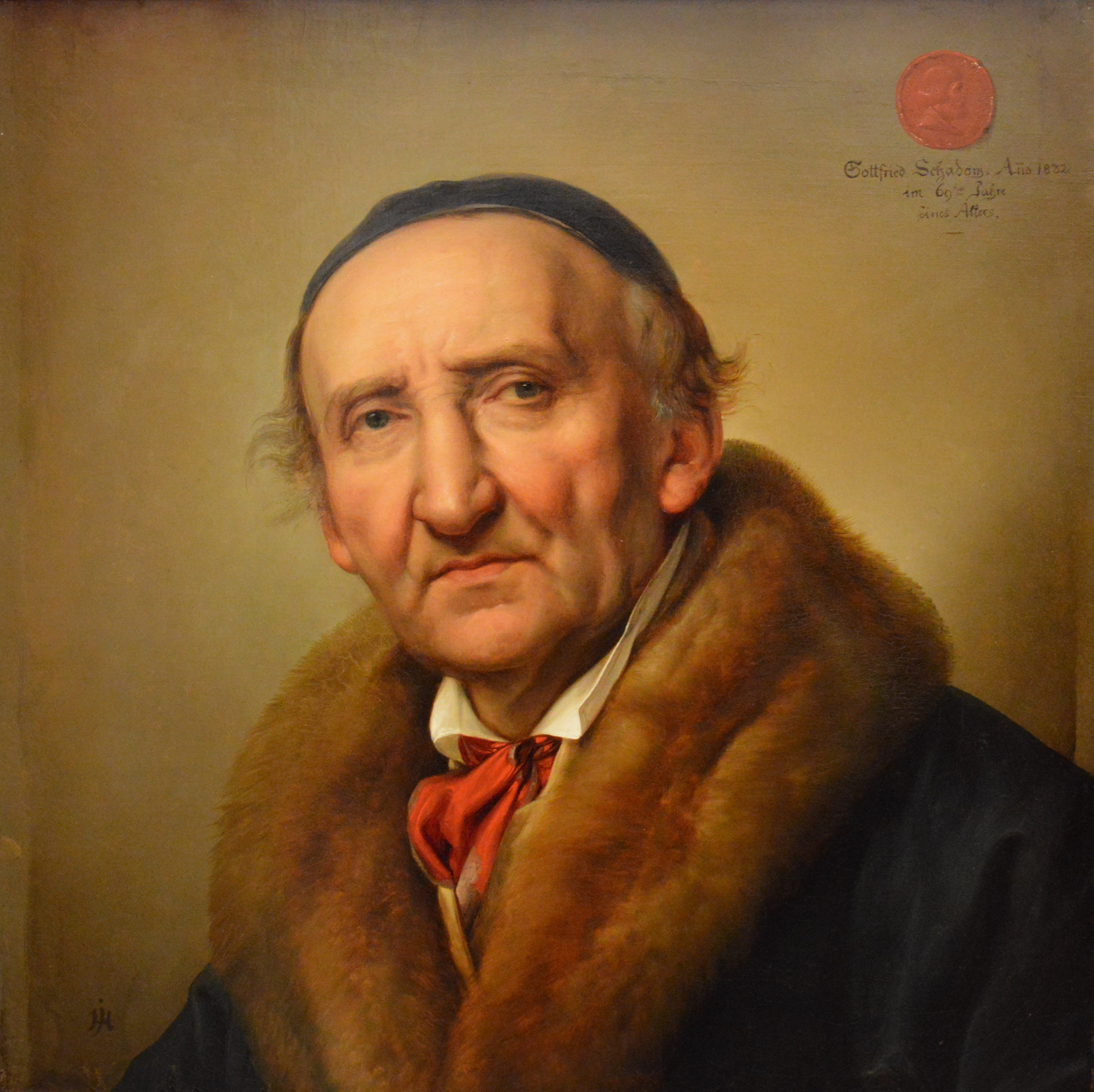
Johann Gottfried Schadow
