= Joseph Huber =

Joseph Huber may refer to:

- Joe Huber (born 2002), American football player
- Joseph Huber (economist) (born 1948), chair of economic and environmental sociology at Martin Luther University of Halle-Wittenberg
- Joseph Huber (gymnast) (1893–1976), French Olympic gymnast
- Joseph J. Huber (1893–?), member of the Wisconsin State Assembly
- Joseph Huber Sr. (died 1867), president of the Los Angeles Common Council
