= Paul Huber (physicist) =

Swiss physicist

Paul Huber (1910 - 5 February 1971) was a Swiss physicist. He was known for his works on nuclear physics.

== Books ==
- Das Problem Der Atomenergie
- Introduction to Physics
