= Bettina =

- Gender: Female

Other names
- Related names: Elizabeth, Tina, Beth

Bettina, also spelt Betina, is a female name used mainly in the German, Danish, Italian, and Hungarian languages. In German and Danish, it is a diminutive of Elisabeth; in Italian, of Elisabetta and Benedetta; and in Hungarian, of Erzsébet.

Benedetta is the Italian feminine form of Benedict, meaning "Blessed," while Elisabetta is the Italian form of Elizabeth, which itself comes from the Hebrew name Elisheva or Elisheba, meaning "my God is an oath".

== People ==
- Bettina Allentoft (born 1973), Danish footballer
- Bettina Aller (born 1962), Danish businesswoman
- Bettina Trump (born 1986), American socialite
- Bettina d'Andrea (1311–1335), Italian legal scholar and professor
- Bettina Aptheker (born 1944), American political activist, feminist professor and author
- Bettina Arndt (born 1949), Australian writer, commentator and sex therapist
- Bettina von Arnim (1785–1859), German writer and novelist
- Bettina von Arnim (artist) (born 1940), German painter
- Bettina Bähr-Losse (born 1967), German lawyer and politician
- Bettina Balàka (born 1966), Austrian novelist
- Bettina Ballard (1905–1961), American fashion editor and writer
- Bettina Banoun (born 1972), Norwegian tax lawyer and actor
- Bettina Bäumer (born 1940), Austrian-born Indian scholar of religion
- Bettina Baumgärtel, German art historian
- Bettina Bedwell (1889–1947), American journalist and fashion illustrator
- Bettina Beer (born 1966), German professor
- Bettina Belitz (born 1973), German writer and journalist
- Bettina Berens (born 1973), German footballer
- Bettina Bergo, Canadian philosopher
- Bettina Bildhauer, German academic
- Bettina Blumenberg (born 1962), German field hockey player
- Bettina Böhler, German film editor
- Bettina Borrmann Wells, Bavarian-born English suffragette
- Bettina Böttinger (born 1956), German television presenter
- Bettina Boxall, American journalist
- Bettina Bradbury, New Zealand-Canadian historian
- Bettina F. Bradbury (1955–2019), American screenwriter
- Bettina Bucher (born 1980), Swiss sport shooter
- Bettina Bunge (born 1963), West German tennis player
- Bettina Burr, American museum trustee
- Bettina Bush (born 1973), voice actor and singer, original voice of Rainbow Brite
- Bettina Carlos (born 1987), Filipina actress and host
- Bettina Cass, Australian sociologist and social policy adviser
- Bettina Cirone (born 1933), American photographer
- Bettina Cointre, French politician
- Bettina Lili Czifra (born 2007), Hungarian gymnast
- Bettina Dajka (born 1990), Hungarian retired handball player
- Bettina Diesner (born 1970), Austrian tennis player
- Bettina Ehrlich (1903–1985), Austrian artist, writer and illustrator of children's books
- Bettina Eick (born 1968), German mathematician
- Bettina Ernst (born 1968), Swiss gymnast
- Bettina Evers (born 1981), German ice hockey forward
- Bettina Fábián (born 2004), Hungarian swimmer
- Bettina Falk (born 1981), Danish football defender
- Bettina Freeman, American opera singer
- Bettina Fulco (born 1968), Argentine retired tennis player
- Bettina Gaus (1956–2021), German journalist
- Bettina Geysen (born 1969), Belgian politician
- Bettina Gilois (1961–2020), American screenwriter
- Bettina Goislard (1974–2003), French United Nations official
- Betina Gonzalez (born 1972), Argentine writer
- Bettina Gorton (1915–1983), wife of Australian Prime Minister John Gorton
- Bettina Graziani (1925–2015), French fashion model
- Bettina Grossman (1927–2021), American visual artist
- Bettina Gruber (born 1985), Swiss cross-country skier
- Bettina Hagedorn (born 1955), German politician
- Bettina Hamilton, Australian film producer
- Bettina Hauert (born 1982), German professional golfer
- Bettina Hauge (born 1964), Danish anthropologist
- Bettina Heim (born 1989), Swiss figure skater
- Bettina Heinen-Ayech (1937–2020), German artist
- Bettina Heltberg (1942–2025), Danish writer and actor
- Bettina Herlitzius (born 1960), German politician
- Bettina Hoffmann (disambiguation), several people
- Bettina Hohls (born 1947), German artist and designer
- Bettina Hollings, New Zealand television producer and media executive
- Bettina Honoré (born 1971), Danish windsurfer
- Bettina Hoppe (born 1974), German actress
- Bettina Horst (born 1971), Chilean politician
- Bettina Hörstrup, German lawyer
- Bettina Hoy (born 1962), German competition equestrian rider
- Bettina Huber (born 1995), Liechtensteiner footballer
- Bettina Riddle von Hutten (1874–1957), American-born novelist
- Betina Jæger (born 1974), Danish dressage rider
- Bettina Jarasch (born 1968), German politician
- Betina Jozami (born 1988), Argentine tennis player
- Bettina Kadner (born 1946), Spanish aviator, first woman to pilot a passenger plane in Europe
- Bettina Kämpf (born 1967), German rower
- Betina Kastbjerg (born 1971), Danish politician
- Bettina G. Keller, German professor
- Bettina Knells (born 1971), German sport shooter
- Bettina Korek (born 1978), American arts advocate
- Bettina Köster (born 1989), German musician
- Betina Krahn, American writer
- Bettina Krug (born 1953), German footballer
- Bettina Kudla (born 1962), German politician
- Bettina Kühn (born 1982), Swiss cyclist
- Bettina Kupfer (born 1963), German actress and writer
- Betina Langerhuus (born 1968), Danish cricketer
- Bettina Le Beau (1932–2015), Belgian actress
- Bettina Lemström (born 1966), Finnish sailor
- Bettina Lerner (born 1957), British television producer
- Bettina Liano (born 1966), Italian-Australian fashion designer and entrepreneur
- Bettina Linn (1905–1962), American novelist and college professor
- Bettina Löbel (born 1962), German swimmer
- Bettina Lotsch (born 1977), German chemist
- Bettina L. Love, African-American educator
- Bettina Lugk (born 1982), German politician
- Bettina Lüscher, German journalist
- Bettina Masuch, German theatrologist
- Bettina Meiser, researcher of the psychosocial aspects of genetics and cancer
- Bettina Meyer, German Antarctic researcher
- Bettina Moissi (1923–2023), German stage and film actress
- Bettina Müller (disambiguation), several people
- Betina O'Connell (born 1976), Argentine actress
- Bettina Oneto (born 1957), Peruvian actress and comedian
- Bettina Pásztor (born 1992), Hungarian handball player
- Bettina Perut (born 1970), Chilean journalist
- Betina Petit-Frère (born 2003), Haitian footballer
- Bettina Petzold-Mähr (born 1982), Liechtensteiner politician and former volleyball player
- Bettina Plank (born 1992), Austrian karateka
- Bettina Plevan (1945–2021), American lawyer
- Betina Popova (born 1996), Russian ice dancer
- Bettina Popp (born 1957), German former track and field sprinter
- Bettina Pousttchi, German artist
- Bettina Rausch (born 1979), Austrian politician
- Bettina Renz, German political scientist
- Bettina Rheims (born 1952), French photographer
- Bettina Richmond (1958–2009), German-American mathematician and murder victim
- Betina Riegelhuth (born 1987), Norwegian handball player
- Bettina Röhl (born 1962), German journalist and author
- Bettina Romero (born 1978), Argentine lawyer and politician
- Bettina Sabatini (born 1966), Italian marathon runner
- Bettina Sågbom, Finnish journalist
- Bettina Santo Domingo, American filmmaker
- Bettina Schaller, Swiss labour market executive and president of the World Employment Confederation
- Bettina Schausten (born 1965), German journalist
- Bettina Schieferdecker (born 1968), East German artistic gymnast
- Bettina Schmidt (1960–2019), East German luger
- Bettina Scholl-Sabbatini (born 1942), Luxembourgish sculptor, painter and ceramist
- Bettina Sellmann, German artist
- Bettina Shaw-Lawrence (1921–2018), English painter
- Bettina Skrzypczak (born 1963), Polish/Swiss composer
- Bettina Somers (1904–1989), Canadian painter
- Betina Soriano (born 1994), Argentine footballer
- Bettina Soriat (born 1967), Austrian singer
- Bettina Speckmann, German computer scientist
- Bettina Staiger (born 1968), German lichenologist
- Bettina Stangneth (born 1966), german philosopher
- Bettina Stark-Watzinger (born 1968), German politician
- Bettina Steinke (1913–1999), American painter and muralist
- Bettina Stumpf (born 1984), German volleyball player
- Betina Temelkova (born 1997), Bulgarian-Israeli judoka
- Bettina Thiele (born 1963), German archer
- Bettina Tietjen (born 1960), German television presenter and talkshow host
- Bettina Trabert (born 1969), German chess Woman Grandmaster
- Bettina Tucci Bartsiotas, American politician
- Bettina Ustrowski (born 1976), German swimmer
- Bettina Valdorf (born 1997), German sport shooter
- Bettina Villars (born 1964), Swiss badminton player
- Bettina Vollath (born 1962), Austrian politician
- Bettina Walter (born 1971), German documentary film producer
- Bettina Warburg (1900–1990), American psychiatrist
- Bettina Wegner (born 1947), German singer-songwriter
- Bettina Welch (1921–1993), New Zealand-born Australian-based actress
- Bettina Werner (born 1965), pioneering artist of the world's first salt crystal paintings
- Bettina Wiegmann (born 1971), German footballer
- Bettina Wiesmann (born 1966), German politician
- Bettina Wulff (born 1973), spouse of former German president
- Bettina Würth (born 1961), German-born Swiss businesswoman and billionaire
- Bettina Zimmermann (born 1975), German model and actress
- Bettina Zipp (born 1972), German sprinter
- Bettina Zopf (born 1974), Austrian politician
- Bettina von Zwehl, German artist

== Fictional characters ==
- Bettina, a recurring character in the TV series Six Feet Under, played by Kathy Bates
- Bettina Peterson, in the film Cast Away, the woman to whom Tom Hank's character delivers a package at the end
