= Looram =

Looram is a surname. Notable people with the surname include:

- Bettina Looram (born c. 1946), later known as Nina Burr, American art patron and civic leader
- Matthew J. Looram Jr. (1921–2004), American diplomat
