= Cirone =

Cirone is a surname. Notable people with the surname include:

- Anthony J. Cirone (born 1941), American percussionist
- Bettina Cirone (1933–2026), American photographer, interviewer, and former model
- Jason Cirone (1971–2024), Canadian-Italian professional ice hockey player
- Kristi Cirone (born 1987), American basketball coach
