= Meiser (surname) =

Meiser is a surname. Notable people with the surname include:

- Bettina Meiser, researcher of the psychosocial aspects of genetics and cancer
- Edith Meiser (1898-1993), actress, radio drama scriptwriter, esp. of Sherlock Holmes stories
- Hans Meiser (1881-1956), German Protestant theologian
- Hans Meiser (1946-2023), German journalist, TV moderator and TV talk show host
- Jonas Meiser (born 1999), German footballer
- Pat Meiser, American women's basketball coach
