= Gopaul =

Gopaul is surname and given name and may refer to:

== Surname ==
- Didier Gopaul (born 1983), Mauritian football player
- Sen Gopaul (born 1957), Guyanese cricketer
- Shea Gopaul, American writer
- Emily Gopaul

== Given name ==
- Gopaul Sahadeo (born 1952), Trinidadian cricketer
