= Antonia De Meo =

American lawyer and diplomat

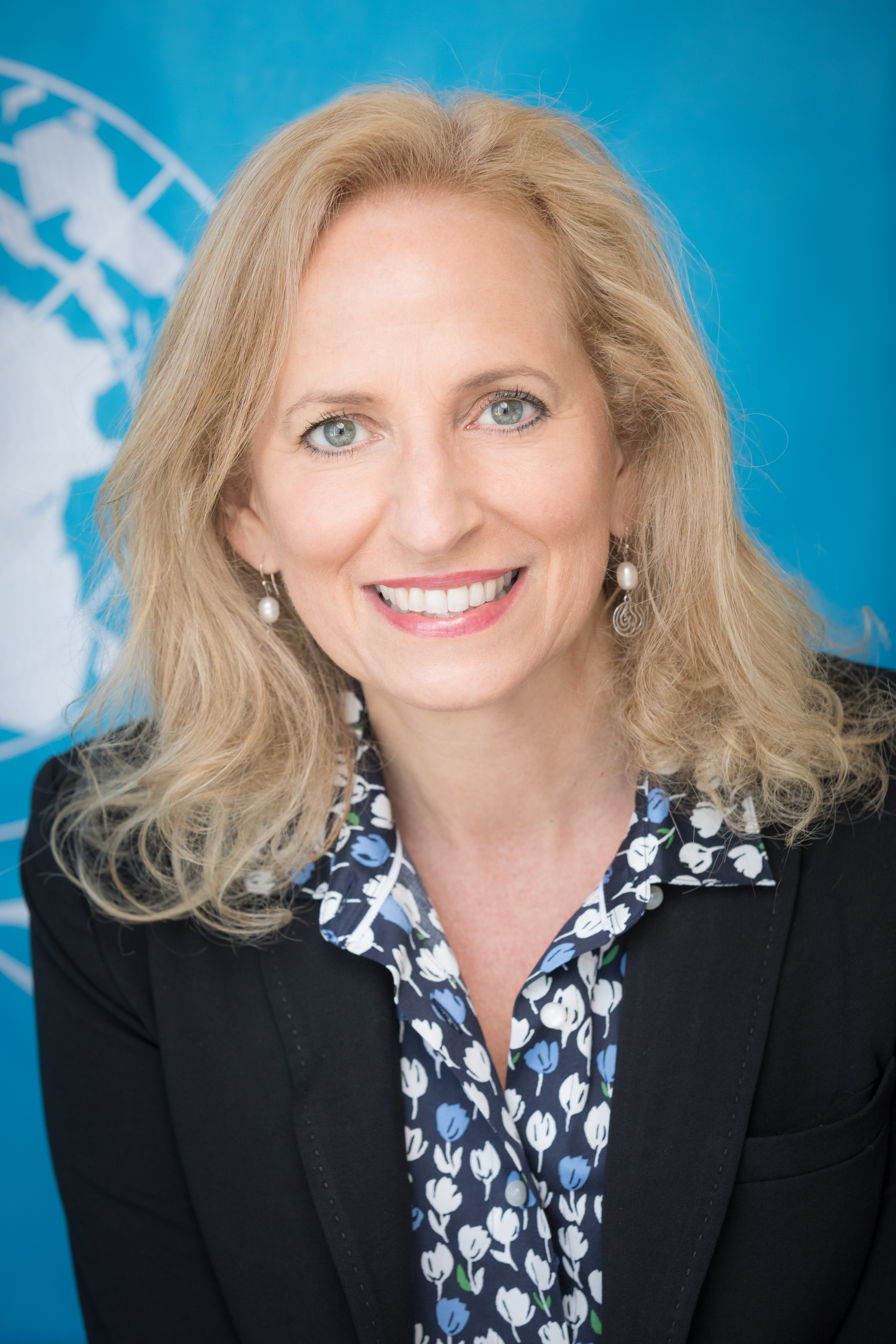

Director of the United Nations Interregional Crime and Justice Research Institute
- Incumbent
- Assumed office 1 July 2020
- Preceded by: Bettina Tucci Bartsiotas

Personal details
- Born: California, U.S.
- Education: Wellesley College (BA); Lewis and Clark College (JD); Harvard University (MPA)

Antonia De Meo is an American lawyer and diplomat. She started serving as the Director of the United Nations Interregional Crime and Justice Research Institute (UNICRI) on 30 March 2020.

== Early life ==
Antonia De Meo was born and raised in California, United States. Her paternal family is of Italian American descent, having emigrated to the United States from the south of Italy in the 1920s and her maternal family is of Swiss Mennonite descent; she holds dual American and Italian nationality.

She received a Bachelor of Art's degree at Wellesley College in 1989, before receiving a Juris Doctor degree from Lewis and Clark Law School in 1994, where she was on the official law review, and a master's degree in public administration from the John F. Kennedy School of Government of Harvard University, where she was a Public Service Fellow.

Licensed to practice law in the States of Oregon and Washington, Antonia De Meo worked as a trial attorney and municipal prosecutor in federal and state courts before pursuing a career in international development and human rights work.

== International career ==
Antonia De Meo began her international career at the American Bar Association’s Central and East European Law Initiative in Moldova, where she worked from 1999 to 2000. In 2000, she joined the Human Rights Chamber for Bosnia and Herzegovina, serving as Deputy Registrar until 2003. She worked as the Anti-Trafficking and Gender Advisor for the Mission to Moldova of the Organization for Security and Co-operation in Europe (OSCE) from 2005 to 2007.

=== United Nations career ===
Antonia De Meo commenced her United Nations career at the United Nations Office for Project Services (UNOPS) in Iraq, Jordan, and Palestine, where she worked from 2009 to 2011. From 2011 to 2014, she held senior management positions with the United Nations Children’s Fund (UNICEF) in Sri Lanka and Sudan.

From 2014 to 2017, Antonia De Meo served as the Chief of Staff of the United Nations Relief and Works Agency for Palestine Refugees (UNRWA), which is the largest UN agency. From 2018 to 2020, she held dual positions as the Chief of the Human Rights, Transitional Justice and Rule of Law Service at the United Nations Support Mission in Libya (UNSMIL) and Representative of the Office of the High Commissioner for Human Rights (OHCHR) in Libya.

=== Director at UNICRI ===
On 1 July 2020, Antonia De Meo was appointed the Director of the United Nations Interregional Crime and Justice Research Institute by Secretary-General António Guterres. She was preceded by Bettina Tucci Bartsiotas.

UNICRI is one of the six autonomous UN research and training institutes and the only one focused on criminal justice and crime prevention. Established in 1968, its Statute sets a broad mandate in the fields of justice, crime prevention, and rule of law. This includes formulating research on emerging threats, developing policies on crime prevention, and implementing programmes in specialized fields of crime, justice, and security.

Some notable milestones have been recorded under Ms. De Meo's leadership.

On 7 June 2023, the United Nations Economic and Social Council (ECOSOC) passed a landmark resolution that acknowledges the role of UNICRI as a valuable component of the UN system and contributor to the realization of the 2030 Agenda for Sustainable Development. This was the first such resolution from an institutional level on the work of UNICRI since UNICRI was established.

On 15 February 2023, UNICRI, with the support of the Permanent Mission of Italy, launched its new Strategic Programme Framework (SPF) 2023 – 2026, which lays the foundation for its work over the next four years.

The Framework considers the rapidly changing global criminal landscape. Criminal networks, alliances, and economies are adapting in sophisticated, transnational, and interconnected ways that allow the expansion of their reach, influence, profit, and impact, while distinct threats are converging and providing new opportunities for criminal enterprises and exploitation to flourish.
