= Belitz =

Belitz may refer to:

== People ==
- Bettina Belitz (born 1973), German writer and journalist
- Semyon Belitz-Geiman (born 1945), Soviet swimmer
- Todd Belitz (born 1975), American baseball player

== Places ==
- Klein Belitz, a municipality in Germany
