= Bettina Schaller =

Swiss labour market executive

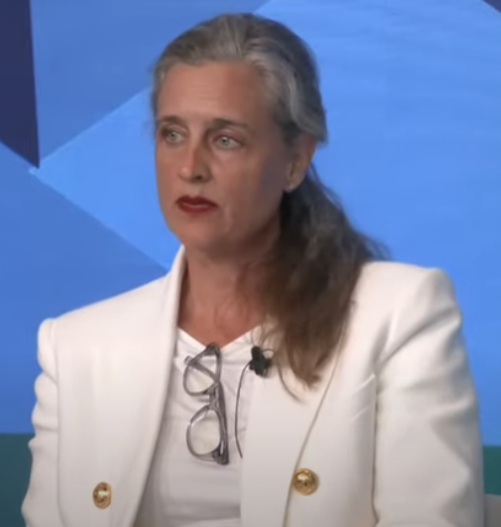
- Speaking at the World Economic Forum's Growth Summit 2023
- Born: Basel, Switzerland
- Occupation: Business executive
- Title: President of the World Employment Confederation

Bettina Schaller is a Swiss labour market executive and president of the World Employment Confederation.

== Early life ==
Born in Basel, Switzerland, she completed a bachelor's degree in Political Science and European studies in Madrid, Spain, and a first master's degree in Freiburg im Brisgau, Germany, followed by a second Advanced Master at the Europa Institut in Basel.

== Career ==
Schaller has worked for the Swiss Federal Department of Foreign Affairs at The Mission of Switzerland to the European Union in Brussels and has held roles in the financial and sports Industry, as well as in the NGO sector. She works for the Adecco Group, where she heads the Group Public Affairs activities, dealing with regulatory and policy issues. She also handles the Adecco Group's engagement in Employers' Association at global and European scale, as well as international institutions.

Schaller is the president of the World Employment Confederation, elected in 2020 and re-elected for a second term in September 2023, after having served as President of the European Chapter from 2015-2020. She serves as vice-chair of the Business OECD (Organisation for Economic Co-operation and Development) Employment, Labour and Social Affairs Committee, as a co-chair of the G20-B20 Future of Work and Education Task Force, a member of the B20 International Advocacy Caucus, a steering group member on the World Economic Forum Center for New Economy and Society and for the Global Apprenticeship Network and an Advisory Board Member of Asia Society Switzerland.

Schaller is a co-founder of the Boardroom, the Swiss arm of the international community of women executives focused on bridging the gender gap on corporate boards.

== Selected awards ==
In 2017, 2018, 2019, 2020 and 2021 Schaller was recognized as a "Staffing 100 Europe Influencer" and was included in the International 50 of the "Global Power 100 – Women in Staffing". Since 2022 Schaller is also featured as a Latin America Top 25 Leader in Staffing.
