= Wonderloch Kellerland =

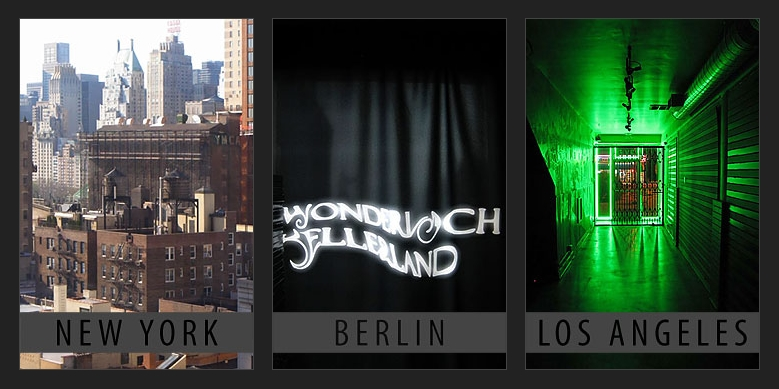
www.wonderloch-kellerland.org

Wonderloch Kellerland was an international project and exhibition space founded by René Luckhardt in his Berlin apartment in the beginning of 2010. The name relates to Dostoyevsky's Notes from Underground (German: “Aufzeichnungen aus dem Kellerloch”) and Lewis Carroll's Alice's Adventures in Wonderland. A role model was also Ludwig II of Bavaria, the “greatest Kellerloch-artist of all times”. The German magazine Art Das Kunstmagazin refers to Wonderloch Kellerland as the “boot camp of subculture”.

== Exhibitions ==
Exhibitions included upcoming L.A. and Berlin based artists. But also works by Martin Kippenberger, Friedrich Schroder-Sonnenstern, Helga Goetze, Louis Waldon, Laibach or a selection of Viennese artists curated by Stefan Bidner and Elke Krystufek. Apart from that Wonderloch Kellerland regularly hosted previously unseen curiosities, e.g. handpainted ceramics of the French Foreign Legion from the Adam Saks Collection, or a "space clearing" by Bettina Sellmann.

With ARTISTS MERCHANDISING ART Wonderloch Kellerland initiated the first series of international exhibitions to deal with the issue of merchandising in contemporary art. The show featured about 300 artists and was exhibited in Berlin, Paris, Los Angeles, Hamburg and Vienna. In 2011 a branch of Wonderloch Kellerland opened in Los Angeles, run by Hans-Peter Thomas. Both spaces are included in the Art Spaces Directory of the New Museum New York. Wonderloch Kellerland closed in 2014.

== Project Philosophy ==
The philosophy of the project was given as: “As an artist you have to go through rabbit holes or cellar holes (German: Kellerlocher) – like Lewis Carroll’s Alice – in order to get to the Wonderland, to blossom anew and to set free new energies.”
