= United Nations Interregional Crime and Justice Research Institute =

Research institute of the United Nations

- Abbreviation: UNICRI
- Formation: 15 January 1968; 57 years ago
- Type: Research institute
- Legal status: Active
- Headquarters: Turin, Italy
- Head: Director; Antonia De Meo
- Parent organization: United Nations Economic and Social Council
- Website: unicri.it

The United Nations Interregional Crime and Justice Research Institute (UNICRI) is one of the five United Nations Research and Training Institutes. The institute was founded in 1968 to assist the international community in formulating and implementing improved policies in the field of crime prevention and criminal justice. Its work currently focuses on Goal 16 of the 2030 Agenda for Sustainable Development, that is centred on promoting peaceful, just and inclusive societies, free from crime and violence.

The institute is an autonomous institution and is governed by its board of trustees. It currently employs around 100 staff, spread between its headquarters in Turin and its extended network of offices.

== History ==
In 1965, the United Nations Economic and Social Council (ECOSOC) outlined in Resolution 1086 B (XXXIX) the organisational arrangements for a United Nations Social Defence Programme. In 1967, UN Secretary-General U Thant issued Bulletin ST/SGB/134, which established the United Nations Social Defence Research Institute (UNSDRI), mandated to develop "new knowledge and the application thereof in advancing policy and practice in the prevention and control of both juvenile delinquency and adult criminality" through research and technical support. The United Nations and the Italian Government signed an agreement in 1968 for the establishment of UNSDRI's Headquarters in Rome and the institute was formally inaugurated the following year by the UN Secretary-General.

Under ECOSOC Resolution No. 1989/56, the institute was renamed the United Nations Interregional Crime and Justice Research Institute (UNICRI) in 1989. Its mandate was enlarged through the adoption of its present statute. UNICRI moved its headquarters from Rome to Turin in 2000.

Since 2000, UNICRI has set up liaison offices in Brussels and Geneva. It established the AI Centre for Advanced Robotics in The Hague in 2017, as well as Centres of Excellence on chemical, biological, radiological and nuclear risk mitigation in Algiers, Amman, Manila, Nairobi, Rabat, Tashkent and Tbilisi in partnership with the European Commission's Joint Research Centre.

== Aims and functions ==
The Institute carries out action-oriented research, training and technical cooperation programmes, with the aim of assisting governmental and non-governmental actors with the development of targeted strategies to address crime in a way that positively impacts on good governance, sustainable development, human rights and security by offering a range of evidence-based responses. Their overarching objective is to assist the international community in achieving key goals of the UN 2030 Agenda for Sustainable Development, and in particular, Goal 16: to promote peaceful, just, inclusive and secure societies, free from crime and violence, where nobody is left behind.

UNICRI structures its activities to meet the identified needs of member states, in line with the 2030 Agenda for Sustainable Development. Its programme activities arise from priorities identified by the UN Annual Crime Prevention and Criminal Justice Commission. The Institute current priorities include, inter alia, activities related to organised crime; juvenile justice; counter-terrorism; major event security; international criminal law; the crime, justice and security perspectives to new technologies such as artificial intelligence and robotics; corruption; human trafficking; illicit trafficking; counterfeiting; cybercrime; crimes against the environment; domestic violence; CBRN threats and drug abuse.

The institute is committed to close international and cross-regional cooperation and encourages the sharing of information and experiences at all levels.

== Location ==
UNICRI has its headquarters on the United Nations Campus in Turin, Italy. It has a Liaison Office in Rome, as well as project offices in Algiers, Amman, Brussels, Geneva, Manila, Nairobi, Rabat, Tashkent, Tbilisi, and the specialized Centre for AI and Robotics in The Hague.

== Activities ==
Within the broad scope of its mandate to develop and implement improved policies in the field of crime prevention and control, the mission of UNICRI is to advance justice and the rule of law in support of peace and sustainable development. UNICRI works in specialized niches and selected areas within the fields of crime prevention, justice, security governance and the risks and benefits of technological advances. UNICRI provides a vital foundation for United Nations policy and operations through its specialized training and capacity-building programmes. The Institute serves as a conduit for channelling innovative ideas from within and outside the United Nations system.

Through its research, needs assessments and analyses of evolving trends, as well as the feedback received from partners, academics, civil society actors, policymakers and practitioners, UNICRI has identified the following threats and challenges in its Strategic Programme Framework for the period 2019–2022:

- Radicalization and violent extremism: the lack of context-specific responses, weak criminal justice systems, and gaps in national and transnational cooperation;
- Transnational organized crime involvement in licit and illicit markets: shadow economies, illicit financial flows and possible links with terrorist networks;
- Weak security governance, poor rule of law and lack of accountability of institutions in post-conflict areas;
- High-tech security: encompassing global threats and solutions;
- Threats to crowded spaces and vulnerable targets;
- Vulnerabilities to criminal exploitation, gender inequalities and human rights violations against vulnerable populations;
- Emerging trends in crimes having an impact on the environment: illegal extraction, use of and trade in environmental resources and trafficking in hazardous substances.

The Framework contains the following six strategic priorities:

1. Preventing and countering violent extremism;
2. Countering organized crime and fighting all forms of trafficking and illicit financial flows;
3. Reinforcing the rule of law in post-conflict countries;
4. Security through research, technology and innovation;
5. Threat response and risk mitigation: security governance;
6. Preventing crime through the protection and empowerment of vulnerable groups.

The responses to the criminal justice, security and governance issues highlighted in the Framework have been carefully crafted to support and contribute to the implementation of the Sustainable Development Goals. The priorities of the Institute are aligned in particular with Goal 16 (To promote peaceful and inclusive societies for sustainable development, provide access to justice for all and build effective, accountable and inclusive institutions at all levels), but they are also linked to several other Goals (2–6, 8, 9, 11, 14 and 15).

== Funding ==
UNICRI is entirely financed from voluntary contributions and does not receive any funding from the regular budget of the United Nations. UNICRI implements its programmes with the generous support of a number of Member States and other donors, including international and regional organizations charities and foundations.

== Official partners ==
UNICRI cooperates with a number of official partners including national government agencies, international organisations, non-governmental organisations and universities. The institute maintains close working relations with UN bodies and agencies, particularly with the United Nations Office on Drugs and Crime (UNODC).
