= Helga Goetze =

German artist, writer and free love activist

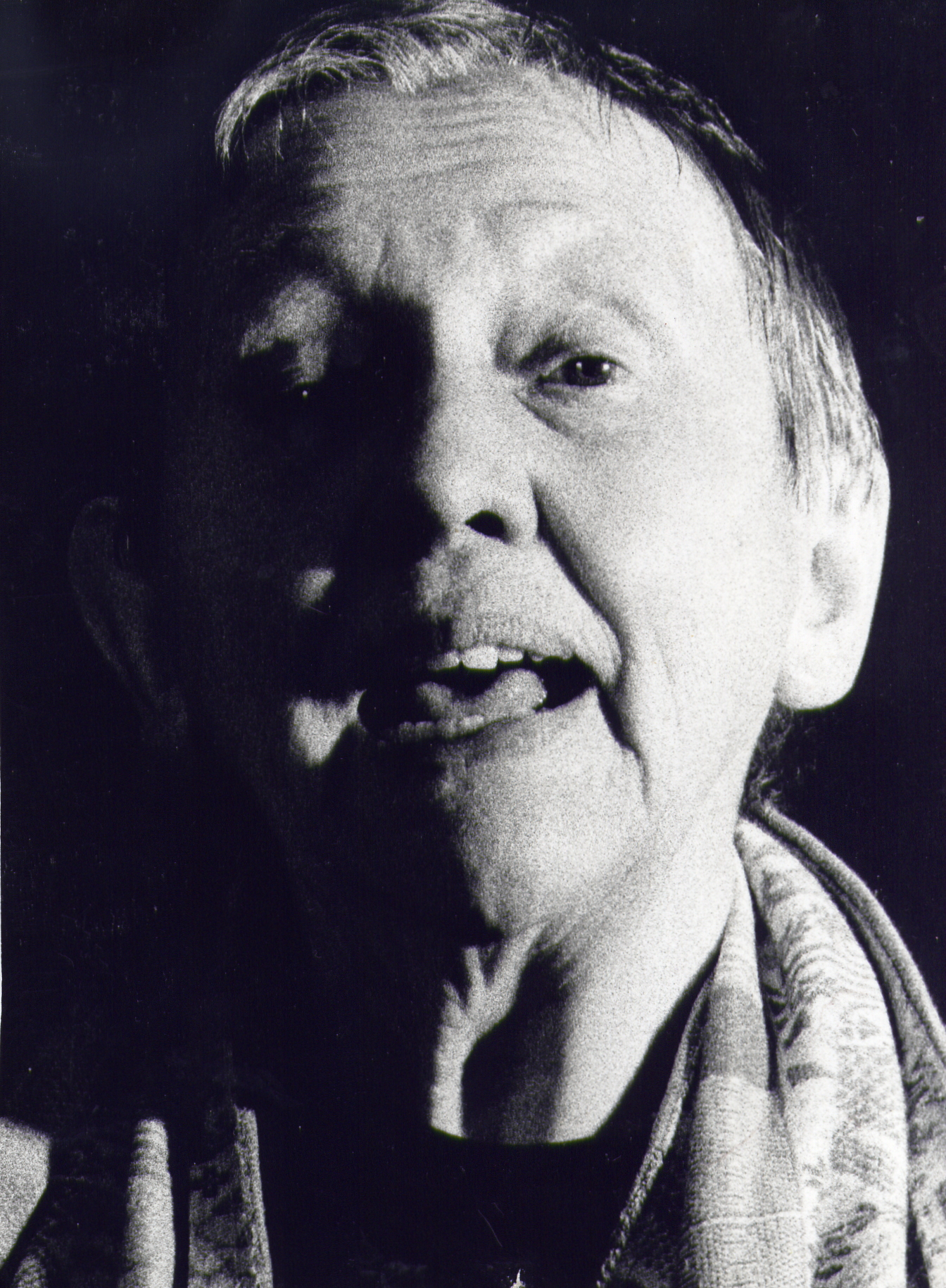
- Born: Helga Sophia Goetze; 12 March 1922; Magdeburg, Weimar Republic
- Died: 29 January 2008 (aged 85)
- Known for: Embroidery; Performance; Painting
- Movement: Outsider art; Free love

Helga Sophia Goetze (12 March 1922 – 29 January 2008) was a German artist, writer and free love activist. Her works included embroidery, paintings and poetry.

== Life ==
Helga Goetze was born in 1922 in Magdeburg. She lived there until the beginning of World War II, when her family moved to Hamburg. She married in 1942 and subsequently had seven children. In 1968, on a trip to Sicily, she met a Sicilian lover with whom she said she experienced her first orgasm; this inspired her to leave her husband, join the free love movement, and live in a variety of communes and shared apartments.

== Work ==
From the late 1960s onwards, Goetze embroidered hundreds of canvases, most featuring images of genitalia and female sexuality, and some depicting scenes from the Christian Bible and other religious texts. She also painted works depicting her Sicilian lover and her ex-husband, and wrote over 3000 poems. In 1982, she moved from Hamburg to Berlin, where she was known to sit in front of the Kaiser Wilhelm Memorial Church or TU Berlin every day with a sign that read "Ficken ist Frieden" ("Fucking is peace").

She appeared in Rosa von Praunheim's films Red Love (1982) and City of Lost Souls (1983) with Jayne County.

== Collections and exhibits ==
A collection of her embroidery is displayed at the Collection de l'art brut museum in Lausanne; a biographical commentary published by the museum notes that Goetze's combination of embroidery and sexual imagery "proclaims women's sexual liberation via a technique that was once the symbol of their subjection". Her embroidery has also been exhibited in the Berlin gallery Wonderloch Kellerland.

== Death ==
Goetze suffered a stroke in August 2007 and died on 29 January 2008.

== See also ==
- List of German women artists
