= Bettina Bildhauer =

German academic

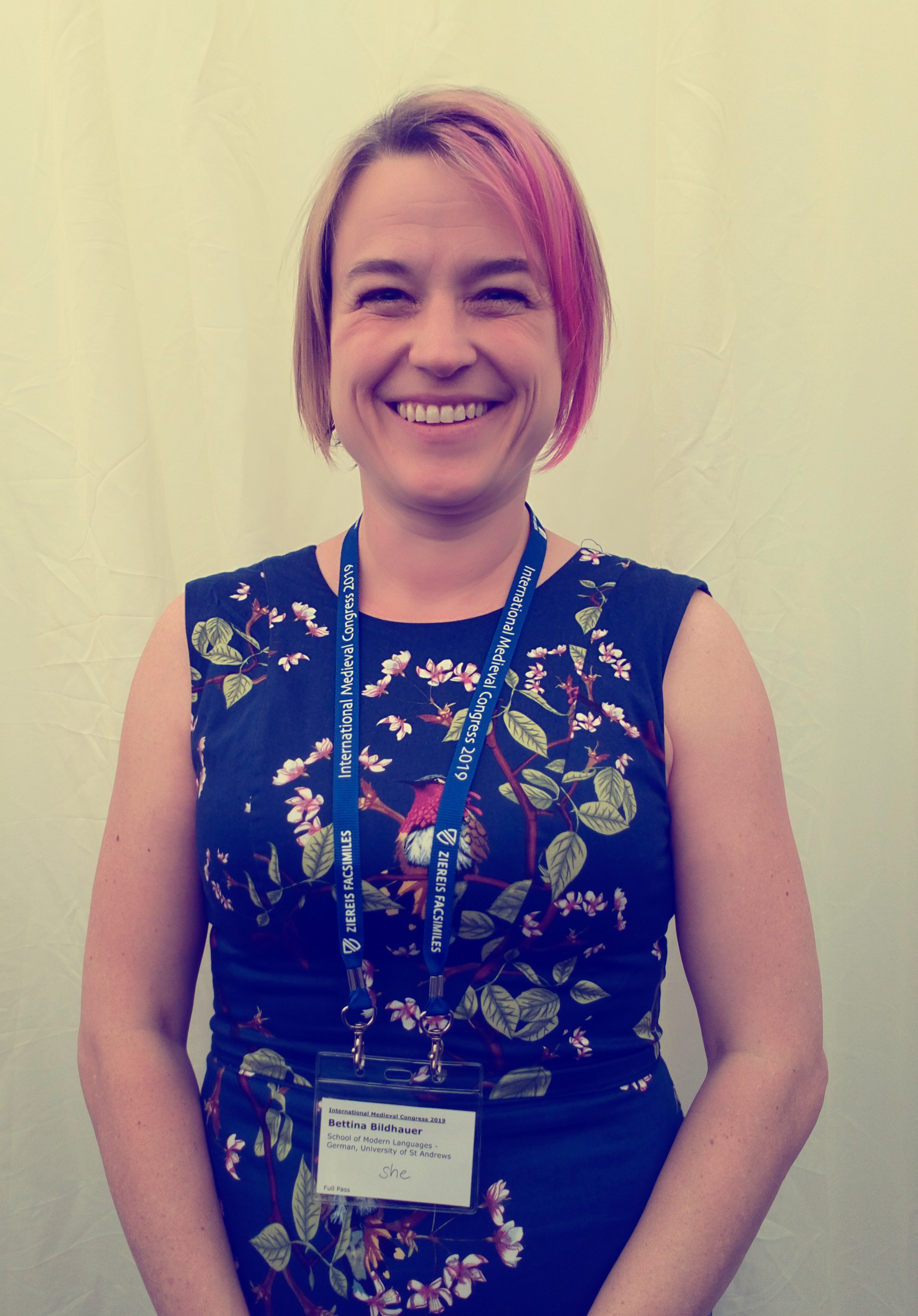
- Awards: Philip Leverhulme Prize (2009)

Academic background
- Education: University of Cambridge (PhD)
- Thesis: Blood in Thirteenth-Century German Literature (2002)

Academic work
- Discipline: German literature scholar
- Sub-discipline: Medieval German literature
- Institutions: University of St Andrews

Bettina M. Bildhauer is Professor of German at the University of St Andrews. She is an expert on medieval German literature in its cultural and multilingual context, and on modern perceptions of the Middle Ages.

== Education ==
Bildhauer received her PhD from the Department of German, University of Cambridge, in 2002. Her doctoral thesis was on Blood in Thirteenth-Century German Literature.

== Career and research ==
Bildhauer has published on medieval themes, particularly blood, monstrosity, and the reception of the Middle Ages in the modern world. Her monograph, Medieval Blood, explored blood as an indication of the bounded limit of the human body, examining medieval, religious and literary ideas about blood. Kerstin Pfeiffer, writing in Literature and Theology, described Medieval Blood as "detailed, insightful, and theoretically informed' and as 'a thought-provoking book which…opens up new lines of inquiry and invites comparative scholarship".

Bildhauer's edited volume (with Robert Mills),The Monstrous Middle Ages, investigated how humans are distinguished from other entities, especially monsters and things. Carolyne Larrington praised for its "breadth, diversity, [and] close focus on the material and historical as well as the textuality" in The Medieval Review.

Bildhauer has published on the role of the Middle Ages in modernity, especially how the Middle Ages are represented in German cinema and film theory. Her edited volume (with Anke Bernau) Medieval Film and her book Filming the Middle Ages investigates how the Middle Ages defines the modern, and how cinema is influential in this context. John Ganim described Filming the Middle Ages as "rigorously argued and researched" in Rethinking History. Kevin Uhalde, writing in The Medieval Review, described The Middle Ages in the Modern World (co-edited with Chris Jones) as high-quality and coherent.

Bildhauer is an Ordinary Member of the editorial board for the Journal Forum for Modern Language Studies, published by Oxford University Press. She is on the editorial board for the Journal Postmedieval, published by Palgrave Macmillan. She writes regularly for the Times Literary Supplement.

== Honours and awards ==
Bildhauer delivered the New York University Medieval and Renaissance Centre Distinguished Lecture Series in Autumn 2017 on 'Inanimate Biographies. Medieval German Narratives about Material Things'.

Bildhauer received a Philip Leverhulme Prize in 2009 for 'outstanding young scholars who have made a substantial and recognised contribution to their particular field of study'. She was awarded a Humboldt Research Fellowship for Experienced Researchers. She was awarded a Leverhulme Research Fellowship for the academic year 2017/18 for the project 'The Untold Stories of Medieval Things'.

== Bibliography ==
- (edited with C. Jones) The Middle Ages in the modern world: twenty-first century perspectives, Proceedings of the British Academy; vol. 208 (Oxford: Oxford University Press, 2017)
- 'Medieval love story', TLS, The Times Literary Supplement, 25 Jan 2017
- ‘Nibelungenfilme als Mittelalterfilme’: Fritz Lang, Harald Reinl, Uli Edel, Quentin Tarantino und die Gegenwart vergangener Gewalttaten', Vom finsteren zum bunten Mittelalter: Wissenschaftliches Symposium der Nibelungenliedgesellschaft und der Stadt Worms vom 16. bis 18. Oktober 2015 im Wormser Kultur- und Tagungszentrum, edited by V. Gallé, (Worms Verlag, 2017)
- 'Medievalism and Cinema', The Cambridge companion to medievalism, edited by L. D'Arcens (Cambridge: Cambridge University Press, 2016) pp. 45–59
- (edited with A. Bernau) Medieval Film (Manchester: Manchester University Press, 2011)
- Filming the Middle Ages (London: Reaktion Books, 2011)
- (edited with Robert Mills) The Monstrous Middle Ages. Toronto: University of Toronto Press, 2003
- (edited with C. Bertelsmeier-Kierst, C. Young) Eine Epoche im Umbruch: Volkssprachliche Literalität 1200-1300 (Niemeyer, 2003)
