= René Luckhardt =

Swiss-German artist

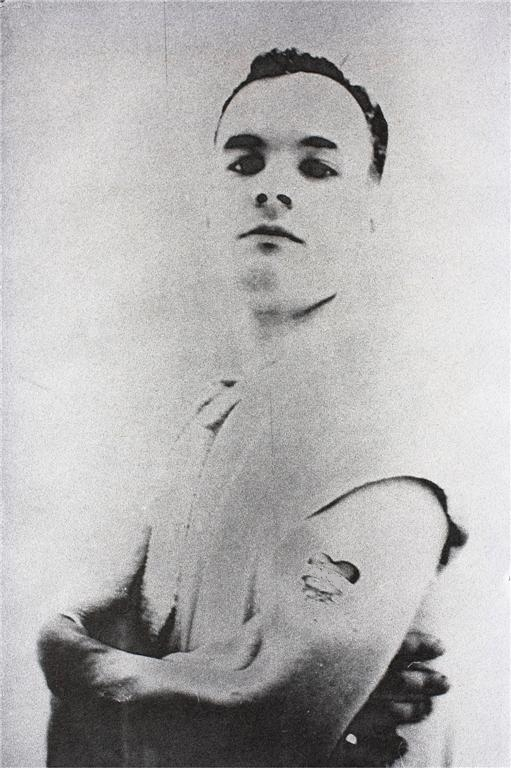
- Born: 1972 (age 52–53); Germany
- Education: Chelsea College of Arts
- Known for: Painting, concept art

René Luckhardt (born 1972) is a Swiss-German artist. Luckhardt holds a Master of Fine Art degree in painting from Chelsea College of Arts, London.

Luckhardt's art often deals with positions in art history, most recently with those of Man Ray or Marjorie Cameron. His practice has been described as "ricerche" (Peter Weiermair). Luckhardt uses the source materials for "multiple transformations." "The archaeological process is not obscured, but becomes part of the work itself by raising questions about the original and the copy." In other series the paintings are "sculpturally transformed". Undergoing a process of endless reproduction and anamorphosis, the painting sculptures appear like "totem(s) of cultural history".

Luckhardt counts Lewis Carroll and Aleister Crowley among his influences. In 2010, he reproduced the latter's Chambre des Cauchemars of the Abbey of Thelema in a gallery space. In 2010, he initiated the international artist salon Wonderloch Kellerland in Berlin, satellites of which existed in Los Angeles and Manhattan. Wonderloch Kellerland is included in the Art Spaces Directory of the New Museum, New York. Luckhardt is co-author of HER, the Hermetic Experimental Research project.

== Exhibitions ==
=== Solo exhibitions ===
- 2021 Flowers still live, Galerie Bernd Kugler, Innsbruck
- 2020 Anamorphic Selfportrait, public space by Nina Mielcarczyk Baumwollspinnerei, Leipzig
- 2020 Anamorphic or apparently anamorphic testpiece, Galerie Bernd Kugler, Innsbruck
- 2018 Diaikone, Weißfrauenkirche, Frankfurt
- 2017 Anamorphic Portraits, Galerie Bernd Kugler, Innsbruck
- 2015 MANufactoRAY, Galerie Bernd Kugler, Innsbruck
- 2013 abc – art berlin contemporary, Berlin
- 2013 René Luckhardt's Kellerloch Paintings, Autocenter, Berlin
- 2012 René Luckhardt's Clown Cube, Bourouina Gallery, Berlin
- 2011 Keller Kolored Kandy Klowns, Wonderloch Kellerland, Los Angeles
- 2011 The Grandmother in Contemporary Art, Galerie Seiler, Munich

=== Group exhibitions ===
- 2019 Auf der Kippe. Eine Konfliktgeschichte des Tabaks, Tiroler Volkskunstmuseum, Innsbruck
- 2018 You are just a piece of action. Portraits from the Miettinen Collection, Salon Dahlmann, Berlin
- 2017 Berlin-Klondyke, Maribor Art Galleries, Maribor
- 2016 Still still life, Galerie Bernd Kugler, Innsbruck
- 2015 Joy, taidetehdas, Konstfabriken, Porvoo
- 2013 Berlin-Klondyke, Werkschauhalle/Baumwollspinnerei, Leipzig
- 2012 Alptraum, Metropolitan Museum of Manila, Manila
- 2009 Transzendenz Inc., Hospitalhof, Stuttgart
