= UNICRI Centre for AI and Robotics =

Organization of the United Nations

United Nations Interregional Crime and Justice Research Institute Centre for AI and Robotics
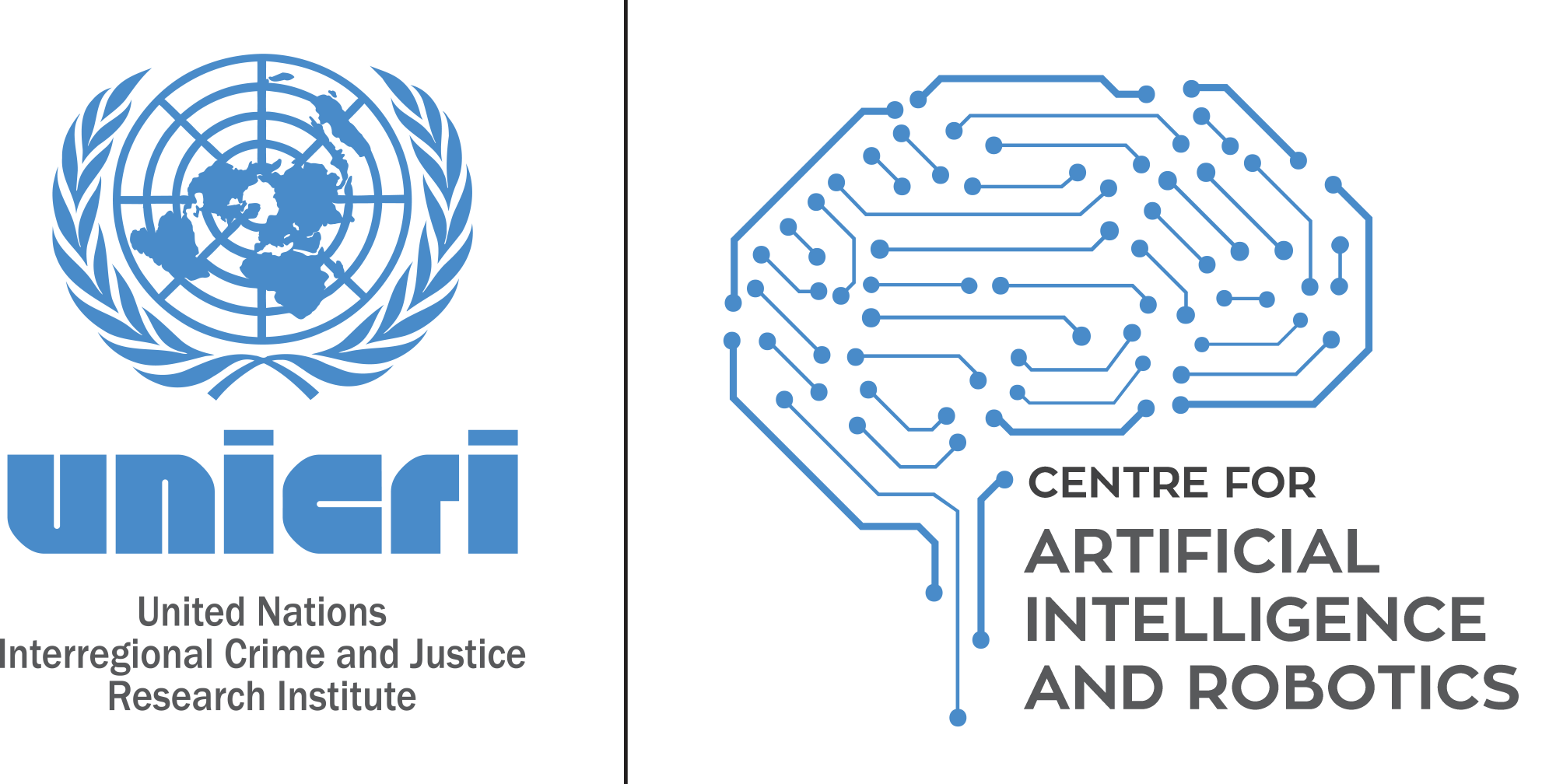
- Established: 2017
- Location: The Hague, The Netherlands
- Key people: Irakli Beridze (Head of Centre)
- Website: www.unicri.it

The Centre for Artificial Intelligence and Robotics at the United Nations Interregional Crime and Justice Research Institute (UNICRI) was established to advance understanding of artificial intelligence (AI), robotics and related technologies with a special focus on crime, terrorism and other threats to security, with the goal of supporting and assisting UN Member States in understanding the risks and benefits of these technologies and exploring their use for contributing to a future free of violence and crime.

== History ==
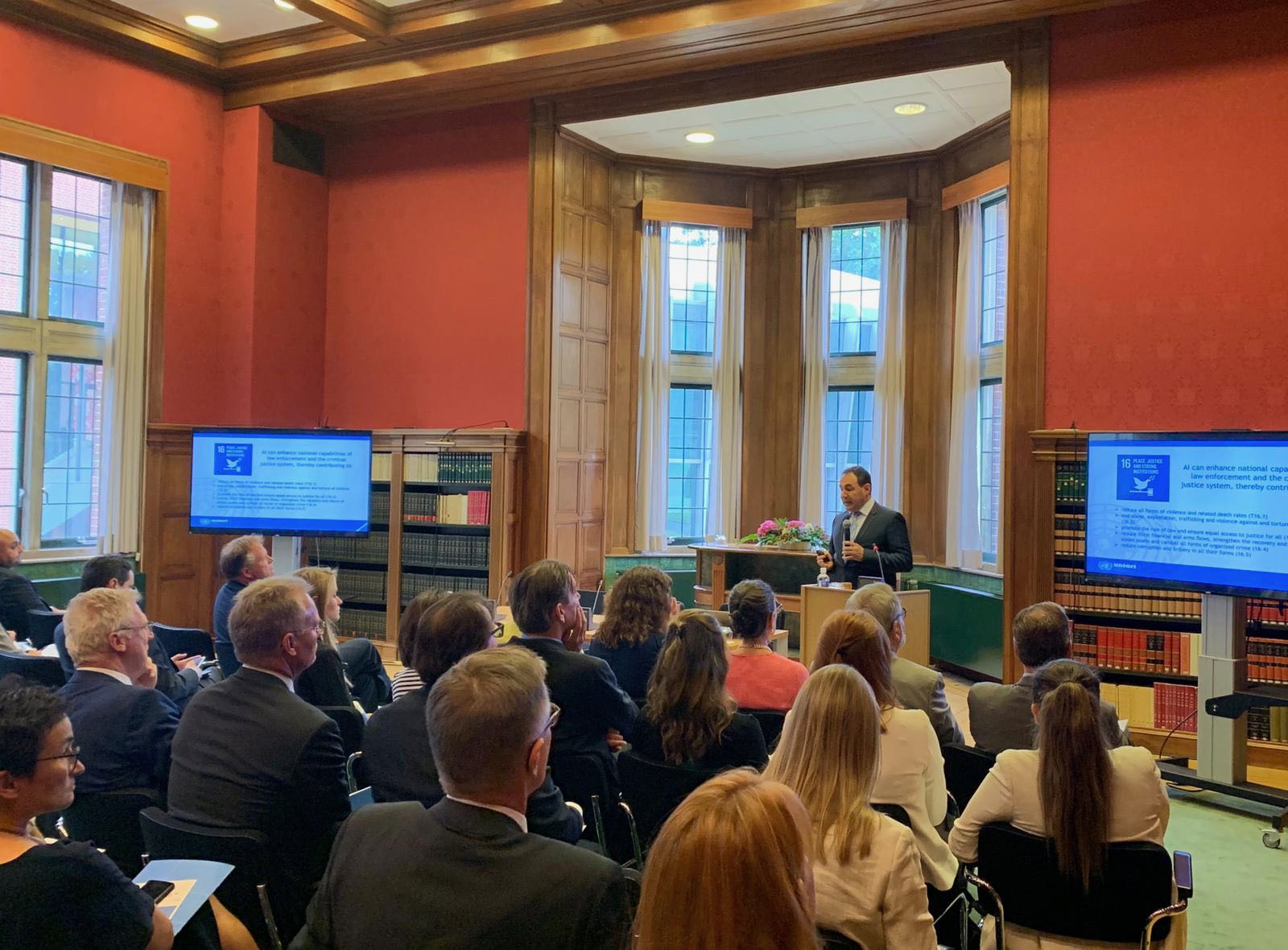
Irakli Beridze, Head of the Centre for AI and Robotics, at the launch of the Centre in Peace Palace, The Hague

UNICRI launched its programme on AI and Robotics in 2015 – making it one of the first such initiatives within the UN system. In September 2017, UNICRI signed a host country agreement with the Ministry of Foreign Affairs of the Netherlands for the establishment of the UNICRI Centre for AI and Robotics in The Hague. On 10 July 2019, the Centre held a formal celebration of its launch at the Peace Palace, in The Hague, The Netherlands.

== Head of the Centre ==
Irakli Beridze is a Georgian international civil servant focused on artificial intelligence, emerging technologies, and international security. He is the founding Head of the Centre for Artificial Intelligence and Robotics at the United Nations Interregional Crime and Justice Research Institute (UNICRI), where he leads global initiatives on the responsible use of AI in areas such as crime prevention, criminal justice, and human rights.

== Cooperation ==
The Centre connects a large network of stakeholders, including governmental entities, industry, academia, think tanks, foundations and civil society. It has signed strategic partnerships with the Kay Family Foundation and industry partners, such as 1QBit Information Technologies, Inc., for the provision of support to the Centre.

The Centre has also established cooperative relationships with the United Nations Office of Information and Communication Technologies (OICT), the Organisation for Security and Cooperation in Europe (OSCE), INTERPOL and other entities.

Together with INTERPOL, the Centre co-organizes the annual Global Meeting on AI for Law Enforcement. The first INTERPOL - UNICRI Global Meeting was held on 11–12 July 2018 at INTERPOL's Global Complex for Innovation (IGCI) in Singapore and the second Global Meeting took place within the framework of INTERPOL World 2019, on 3–4 July 2019 in Singapore. The Third Global Meeting will take place in The Hague, The Netherlands in 2020.

UNICRI and INTERPOL released a report AI and Robotics for Law Enforcement at the United Nations in New York in April 2019. A follow-up report, Towards Responsible AI Innovation, was released by UNICRI and INTERPOL in May 2020.

== Activities ==
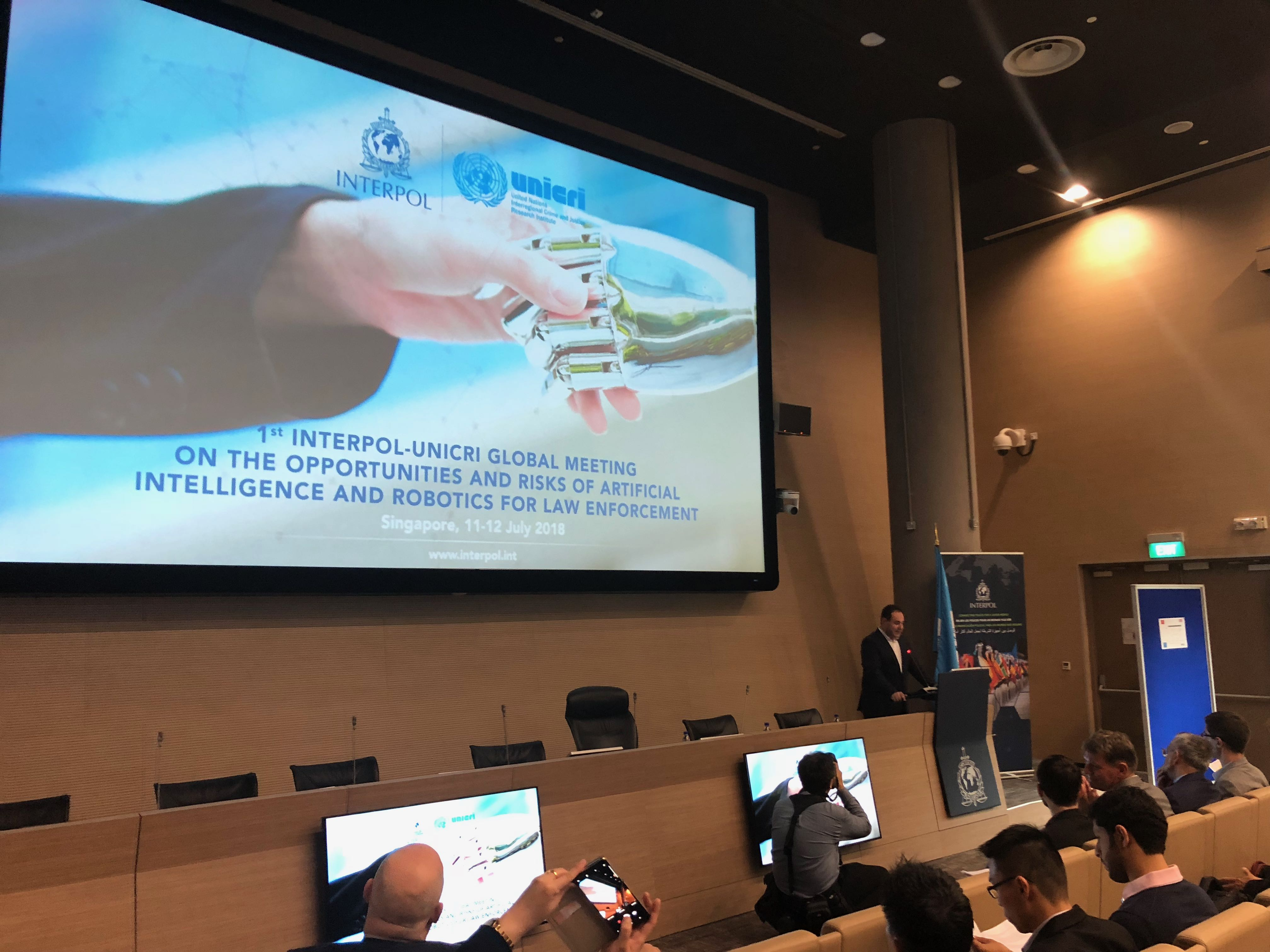
Irakli Beridze, opening of the First UNICRI-INTERPOL Global Meeting on AI for Law Enforcement, Interpol Innovation Complex, Singapore, 11 July 2018

The Centre conducts action-oriented research, training and technical cooperation programmes. It is also exploring the conceptual design and development of AI-based tools. Current priorities for this include, inter alia, tools for combating human trafficking, child sexual abuse material, corruption and bribery, the financing of terrorism, terrorist use of the Internet and social media, and identifying programmatically manipulated voice or video content (deepfakes).

In November 2020, UNICRI through its Centre of Artificial Intelligence and Robotics, and the Ministry of Interior of the United Arab Emirates launched the ‘Artificial Intelligence for Safer Children’ Initiative. This new initiative seeks to combat online CSAM through the joint exploration of new technological solutions, specifically Artificial Intelligence (AI) and machine learning, together with law enforcement agencies to combat the growing problem of online CSAM. On 23 March, the first meeting of the advisory board of the "AI for Safer Children" initiative met virtually, which is composed of global leaders in child protection, law enforcement and AI, including representatives from: Aarambh India; the Bracket Foundation; the Canadian Center for Child Protection; World Childhood Foundation; ECPAT; the European Commission Directorate-General for Migration and Home Affairs; Europol; the Fund to End Violence Against Children; Griffeye; the Gucci Children’s Foundation; International Justice Mission; INTERPOL; the National Center for Missing and Exploited Children; Red Papaz; SafeToNet; Thorn; UNICEF; University of Massachusetts Amherst; the Virtual Global Taskforce; and the WePROTECT Alliance.

In October 2021, the Centre of AI and Robotics at UNICRI in partnership with INTERPOL Innovation Centre jointly launched the Toolkit for the Responsible use of AI by Law Enforcement. The purpose of this toolkit is to provide practical support on the specific use of AI for global law enforcement. Conceptualised as a collection of practical insights, use cases, principles, recommendations and resources, it will guide law enforcement to utilise AI to support specific strategic and operational objectives and still abide by the universal principles or considerations to ensure trustworthy use of AI in a lawful and responsible manner. While AI is undeniably a transformative technology, the potential of which to support law enforcement work is immense, there are equally numerous pitfalls that could undermine fundamental freedoms and infringe human rights, such as the right to privacy, equality and non-discrimination, as well as public trust in law enforcement as an institution. Failure to adequately navigate or cater for these pitfalls, could limit the possibility for law enforcement to revolutionise police work and practices with AI. On 12 November 2020, a Core Group meeting of experts from both the law enforcement and AI communities took place and served as a forum for initial discussions on the possible objective, structure, target audience and key points of the Toolkit.
