= Bettina Huber =

Liechtensteiner footballer

Personal information
- Date of birth: 7 September 1995 (age 31)
- Position: Goalkeeper

Youth career
- 2005–2009: Triesenberg

Senior career*
Years	Team	Apps	(Gls)
2009–2021	Triesen		
2021–2025	Staad		

International career
2021–2025	Liechtenstein	12	(0)
- * Club domestic league appearances and goals as of 9 April 2026

Bettina Huber (born 7 September 1995) is a former Liechtensteiner footballer who last played as a goalkeeper for FC Staad and the Liechtenstein national football team.

== Career statistics ==
=== International ===
Liechtenstein
Year	Apps	Goals
2021	4	0
2022	3	0
2023	1	0
2024	1	0
2025	3	0
Total	12	0
