= Bettina Lüscher =

German journalist

Bettina Lüscher (born July 1961) is a German journalist and presenter. She was the principal spokesperson for the United Nations World Food Programme in New York City, after being a news anchor for CNN International.

== Life ==
After graduating from school, Bettina Lüscher worked as a freelance reporter for the Münstersche Zeitung and WDR radio from 1981 to 1983, parallel to her studies of politics in Münster. A Fulbright Scholarship enabled her to gain her first television experience at the campus station when she completed a Master of Arts (M.A.) in political science at the University of Wisconsin-Madison between 1983 and 1985. An internship at CNN followed.

In 1984 she finally got a permanent position as a video journalist at CNN Headline News in Atlanta, followed by a transfer to the then new CNN studio in Frankfurt am Main in 1985, from where she directly witnessed the Gulf War as a reporter in 1990. In 1991, she was a presenter at West 3 Aktuell and co-presenter of Aktuelle Stunde on WDR Fernsehen before moving back to CNN. In Atlanta, she was the only German presenter at that time to host CNN World News from 1992 to 1998, reaching 180 million households worldwide, and occasionally hosting other programs such as American Edition. In March 1998, Bettina Lüscher returned to Germany and co-moderated CNN This Morning from the n-tv studio in Berlin. In February 2001, she became CNN's official Germany correspondent and office manager in Berlin.

After working for CNN for 15 years, Bettina Lüscher joined the United Nations World Food Programme in 2004, first in Berlin, then as main spokesperson for North America in New York City, and then in Berlin again. She retired in 2020.
