= Betina Jæger =

Danish dressage rider

Personal information
- Nationality: Danish
- Born: May 15, 1974 (age 51)

Sport
- Country: Denmark
- Sport: Dressage

Achievements and titles
- World finals: 2018 FEI World Equestrian Games

Betina Jæger is a Danish Dressage rider. She competed at the 2018 FEI World Equestrian Games in Tryon, North Carolina and at the 2019 World Championship for Young Horses in Ermelo. She competes international Grand Prix since 2011.
