= Bettina G. Keller =

Professor for Theoretical Chemistry at Freie Universität Berlin

- Education: University of Karlsruhe; ETH Zürich
- Scientific career
- Fields: Theoretical chemistry
- Workplaces: Freie Universität Berlin
- Doctoral advisor: Wilfred F. van Gunsteren

Bettina G. Keller is a professor for Theoretical Chemistry at Freie Universität Berlin.

== Life and education ==
Keller did her Abitur at the Remstal-Gymnasium Weinstadt in 2000. In October 2000, she started her diploma studies at University of Karlsruhe, Germany. In 2002, she continued her diploma studies at ETH Zürich. She received her diploma in 2005. The title of her diploma thesis was "Estimating the absolute entropy of a liquid based on a single molecular dynamics simulation under periodic boundary conditions." In 2005, she started her PhD studies in chemistry at ETH Zürich. She finished her PhD thesis "Algorithms for the Analysis of Biomolecular Simulations: Ensemble Averages, Marginal Distributions, Clustering, and Markov Models" in the group of Wilfred F. van Gunsteren in 2009. From January 2010 to July 2010, she was a visiting lecturer at CECAM Node "Scientific Computing in the Molecular Sciences" at Freie Universität Berlin. From July 2010 to September 2013, she was a postdoctoral researcher at Freie Universität Berlin. From October 2013 to September 2019, she was a junior professor for Theoretical Chemistry at Freie Universität Berlin. Since September 2019, she is a professor for Theoretical Chemistry at Freie Universität Berlin.

== Awards ==
- 2018: Hans G. A. Hellmann-Preis for Theoretical Chemistry awarded by the Arbeitsgemeinschaft Theoretische Chemie
- Since June 2016: Member of the Junge Akademie of the Berlin-Brandenburg Academy of Sciences and Humanities (BBAW) and the German National Academy of Sciences Leopoldina
