= Bettina Beer =

German professor

Bettina Beer (born 14 November 1966, Frankfurt am Main) is a German ethnologist and cultural and social anthropologist. She is a professor of ethnology at the University of Lucerne

== Life ==
Beer studied ethnology, folklore and Spanish at the University of Hamburg from 1986 to 1992. She wrote her master's thesis on Ethnological work on interethnic marriages in pre-industrial societies and then researched marriage migration and interethnic marriages in the Filipino community in Hamburg until 1996. From 1993 to 1995 she was supported by a doctoral scholarship from the University of Hamburg. Starting in 1993, she went on field trips to the Philippines to conduct research on “marriage migration and interethnic marriages” (DAAD-funded).

In 2001 she completed her habilitation in ethnology at the University of Hamburg with a thesis on “body concepts, interethnic relationships and theories of racism”. In 2006 she received a W-3 professorship for ethnology at the Institute for Anthropology at the University of Heidelberg. In 2008 she was appointed full professor of ethnology at the seminar for cultural and social anthropology at the University of Lucerne. From 2011 to 2014 she held the Leibniz Chair at the Leibniz Center for Tropical Marine Ecology (ZMT Bremen).

Beer mainly researches Transcultural Relations and Migration, kinship and political anthropology, ethnology of the senses, psychological ethnology (especially cognitive ethnology) and the history of ethnology. With a focus on Wampar, a culture in the middle reaches of the Markham River in the Morobe Province of today's Papua New Guinea, she continues research that began in 1958 from her 2019 deceased husband Hans Fischer were started at the University of Hamburg.

== Publications ==
- German-Filipino marriages: interethnic marriages and migration of women, Reimer, Berlin 1996, ISBN 3-496-02601-4 (dissertation University of Hamburg 1996, 301 pages).
- Post from the Philippines. Ethnological research through letters, Lit, Hamburg 1998, ISBN 978-3-8258-3685-6.
- Joe's stories. Analyzes of Filipino stories in their cultural context (= Cultural Analyzes, Volume 2), Reimer, Berlin 1999, ISBN 978-3-496-02673-0.
- Body concepts, interethnic relationships and theories of racism: a cross-cultural study (= Cultural Analyzes, Volume 4). Reimer, Berlin 2002, ISBN 3-496-02735-5 (Habilitation thesis University of Hamburg 2002, 453 pages).
- (Ed.): Methods and techniques of field research, Reimer, Berlin 2003, ISBN 978-3-496-02754-6.
- Women in German-speaking ethnology. A manual. Böhlau, Cologne / Weimar / Vienna 2007, ISBN 978-3-412-11206-6.
- with Gabriele Alex and Bernhard Hadolt (eds.): Wa(h)re Medicine: on the authenticity and commodification of health and healing (= Curare 1978, year 35(2012)3, ISSN 0344-8622). Published by AGEM - Arbeitsgemeinschaft Ethnomedizin e.V. VWB - Publishing House for Science and Education, Berlin 2012, ISBN 978-3-86135-768-1.
- with Stephan Claassen: The Wampar String Figure Repertoire in Comparative Perspective. Social Change and Interethnic Relations in Papua New Guinea, In: Bulletin for the International String Figure Association 21, ISFA Press, Pasadena (California) 2014, pp. 15–141.
