= Bettina Balàka =

Austrian novelist (born 1966)

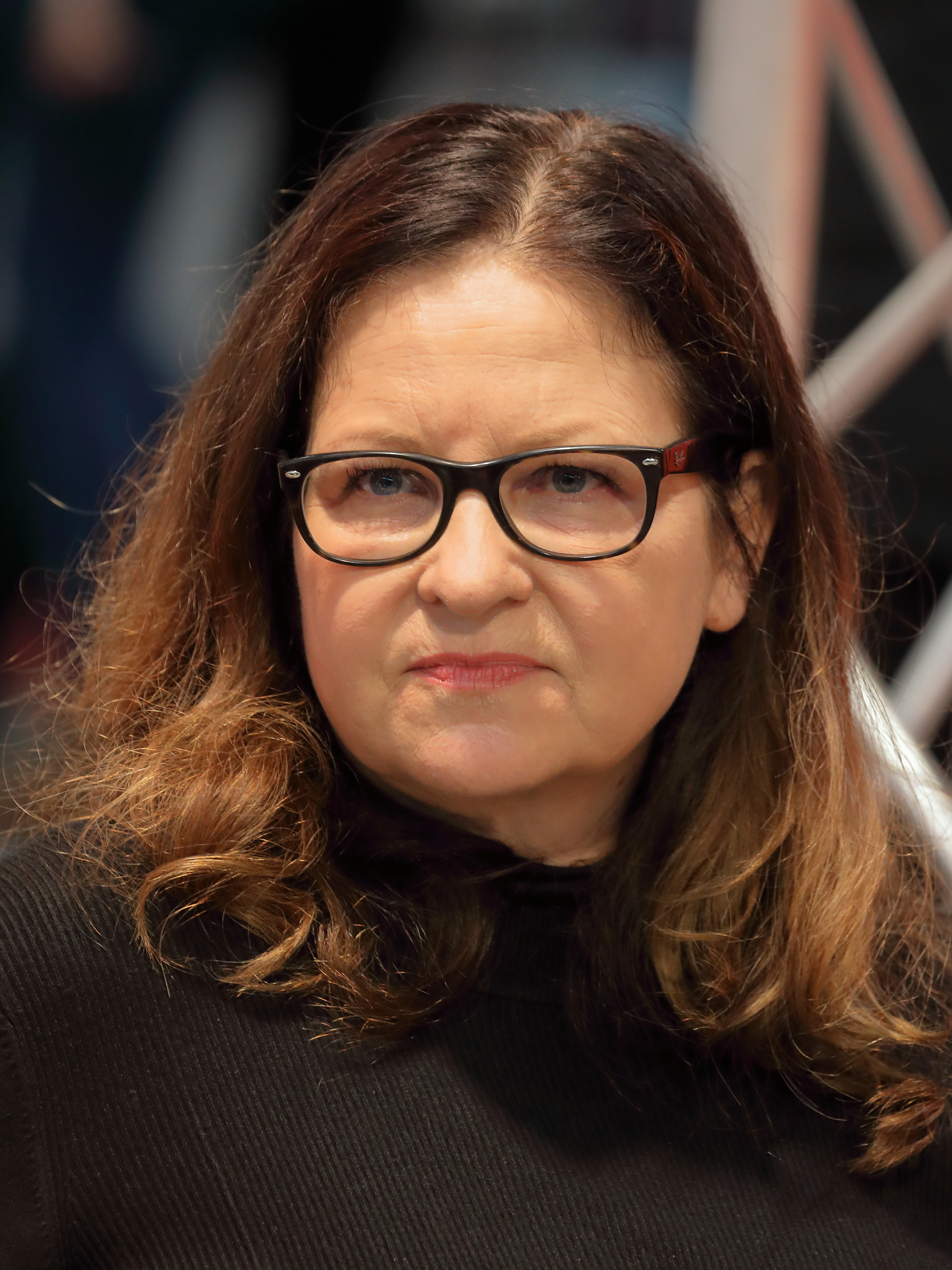
Bettina Balàka photographed in 2019

Bettina Balàka (born 1966) is an Austrian novelist, poet, essayist, playwright and short story writer. Recent novels include Eisflüstern (The Whisper of Ice, 2006), Kassiopeia (2010) and Unter Menschen (Among People, 2014).

== Biography ==
Born on 27 March 1966 in Salzburg, Balàka studied English and Italian at the Institut für Übersetzer- und Dolmetscherausbildung (Institute for Translation and Interpreting Studies) in Vienna, earning a master's degree in 1991. Her studies included extended trips to Britain and the United States. She has since worked as a freelance writer and translator in Vienna. In addition to her novels, poetry, drama and radio plays, Balàka has frequently contributed to literary journals and anthologies. She lives with her daughter in Vienna.

Her novel Eisflüstern, the story of a soldier returning from war, is one of the few Austrian thrillers set during the turning point of the First World War with the collapse of the Austrian Habsburgs and the establishment of a new republic. Unter Menschen is a humorous yet sad tale tracing a dog's experiences of a series of different owners. Die Prinzessin von Arborio tells how a restaurant owner who has committed three murders is interrogated by a psychologist who falls in love with her. The Austrian newspaper Kurier quotes the author's explanation: "I am a very curious person. That's why I'm always looking for new themes. In Die Prinzessin von Arborio I've chosen criminal psychology, hybristophilia, and falling in love as the 'most beautiful form of psychosis'."

== Awards ==
Balàka's many awards include the Salzburger Lyrikpreis (Salzburg Poetry Prize, 2006) und the Friedrich-Schiedel- Literaturpreis (Friedrich Schiedel Literature Prize, 2008).

== Selected publications ==
The following publications are all in German:

- Die dunkelste Frucht. Poetry. (Lyrik aus Österreich. Band 60). G. Grasl, Baden bei Wien 1994, ISBN 3-85098-218-1.
- Krankengeschichten. Short stories, Droschl, Graz 1996, ISBN 3-85420-440-X.
- Road movies. 9 Versuche aufzubrechen. Short stories. Droschl, Graz 1998, ISBN 3-85420-483-3.
- Der langangehaltene Atem. Novel. Droschl, Graz 2000, ISBN 3-85420-533-3.
- Messer. Essay. Droschl, Graz 2000, ISBN 3-85420-553-8.
- Im Packeis. Poetry. Deuticke, Vienna 2001, ISBN 3-216-30458-2.
- Dissoziationen. Gedichte aus Pflanzen und Vögeln. Poetry. Resistenz, Linz/Vienna 2002, ISBN 3-85285-081-9.
- Unter Jägern. Short stories. Droschl, Graz 2002, ISBN 3-85420-610-0.
- Eisflüstern. Novel. Droschl, Graz/Vienna 2006, ISBN 3-85420-710-7.
- Schaumschluchten. Poetry. Droschl, Graz/Vienna 2009, ISBN 978-3-85420-750-4.
- Auf offenem Meer. Short stories. Haymon Verlag, Innsbruck 2010, ISBN 978-3-85218-625-2.
- Kassiopeia. Novel. Haymon Verlag, Innsbruck 2012, ISBN 978-3-85218-693-1. (June 2012: ORF best seller list)
- Unter Menschen. Novel. Haymon Verlag, Innsbruck 2014, ISBN 978-3-7099-7040-9.
- Die Prinzessin von Arborio. Novel. Haymon Verlag, Innsbruck 2016, ISBN 978-3-7099-7239-7.
