= The Medieval Review =

- Discipline: Medieval studies
- Language: English
- Edited by: Diane Reilly

Publication details
- Former name: Bryn Mawr Medieval Review
- History: 1993-present
- Publisher: Indiana University (United States)
- Open access: Yes

Standard abbreviations
- ISO 4: Mediev. Rev.

Indexing
- ISSN: 1096-746X
- LCCN: sn97004868
- OCLC no.: 37892235

Links
- Journal homepage

The Medieval Review, formerly the Bryn Mawr Medieval Review, is a peer-reviewed online academic journal that was established in 1993. Originally the journal was published at the University of Washington, and from 1995 to 2007 it was published by Western Michigan University. Since 2007 it has been published by Indiana University. The journal reviews books on medieval issues. The executive editor is Diane Reilly (Indiana University). The journal operates as a moderated email distribution list and is one of the oldest electronic journals in existence.
