= Bettina Müller =

Bettina Müller may refer to:

- Bettina Müller (canoeist) (born 1952), German canoeist
- Bettina Müller (politician) (born 1959), German politician, Member of the Bundestag since 2013
- Bettina Müller-Weissina (born 1973), Austrian sprinter
