= Bettina Knells =

German sport shooter (born 1971)

Bettina Knells (born 14 April 1971) is a German sport shooter who competed in the 1996 Summer Olympics.
