= Bettina Borrmann Wells =

German-born US/UK suffragette

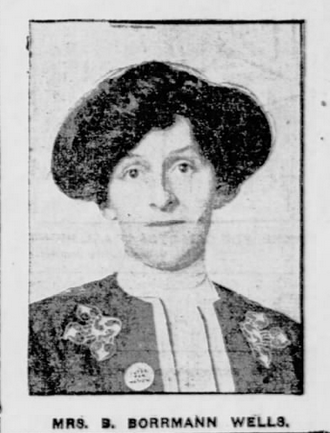
- In the New York Tribune, 20 January 1907
- Born: Nuremberg, Bavaria
- Education: University of Geneva; Columbia University
- Occupation: Suffragette
- Organization(s): Women's Social and Political Union; Women's Freedom League; Society of Women Journalists of London

Bettina Borrmann Wells (born 1874) was a Bavarian-born English suffragette who toured the United States as an organizer and lecturer. (She rejected the term "suffragist" for her work, preferring "suffragette".)

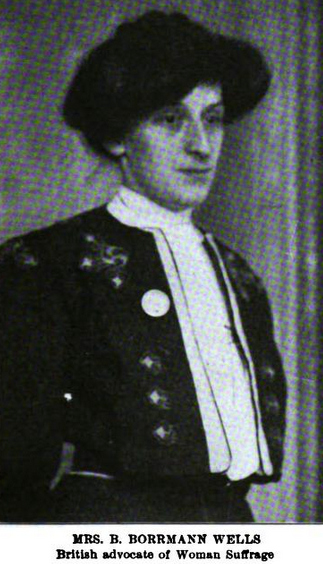
The World To-Day, March 1907

== Early life and education ==
Bettina Borrmann was born in Nuremberg, Bavaria, and was a graduate of the University of Geneva. In 1914, 1915, and 1916 she earned bachelor's and master's degrees in economics and psychology at Columbia University. Her master's thesis was titled "The economic basis of the present feminist movement" (1915).

== Suffragette ==
Bettina Borrmann Wells was a member of the Women's Social and Political Union. In November 1908, Bettina Borrmann Wells served a three-week sentence in Holloway Prison, for "obstructing a policeman" at a demonstration in London. She called herself a "suffragette", explaining that "a suffragette is a suffragist who is willing to die for the cause." By 1910 Wells had moved away from Emmeline Pankhurst's arm of the movement and she was very active in the Manchester wing of the Women's Freedom League. In 1911 an American newspaper described her as head of the propaganda department of the "Women's Federation League" of England.

== Activities in the United States ==
In the United States in 1908, Wells, Maud Malone, Christine Ross Barker, Sophia Loebinger, and others organized open-air meetings of the Progressive Woman Suffrage Union in New York City's Madison Square, Wall Street, Harlem, and Brooklyn, against significant resistance from the city's residents and business leaders. In spring 1908, Wells and Malone led a suffrage parade in New York City, without a permit. Later that year, Wells and three other suffragists attempted to meet with Theodore Roosevelt in Oyster Bay, New York, but they were rebuffed by the Secret Service.

She toured the United States and Canada with her husband, meeting with suffrage activists in various cities. "Women will only get the vote when they make men believe they are serious and will pay the price for it," she told an audience in Brooklyn, "They won't get it by arranging for pink teas and yellow bazars." In 1909 she published a pamphlet, America and Woman Suffrage, detailing suffrage activities in Wyoming, Utah, Colorado, and Idaho.

Wells also wrote pro-suffrage letters to the editor, both in Great Britain and in the United States. "I admit that 'better laws have passed without any vote of woman'," she conceded in one 1908 letter to the New York Times. "One can also get to California on foot, but most of us prefer speedier methods of traveling."

Wells traveled to Washington, D.C. in January 1917, to take a turn as one of the "Silent Sentinels" picketing the White House, in the early weeks of that protest.

== Personal life ==
Bettina Borrmann married English businessman Herbert James Clement Wells in 1900. She was a member of the Lyceum Club of London, and of the Society of Women Journalists of London.
