= Global Apprenticeship Network =

Swiss non-profit based in Geneva

Global Apprenticeship Network Le Réseau mondial pour l’apprentissage (in French) La Red Mundial de Aprendizaje (in Spanish)
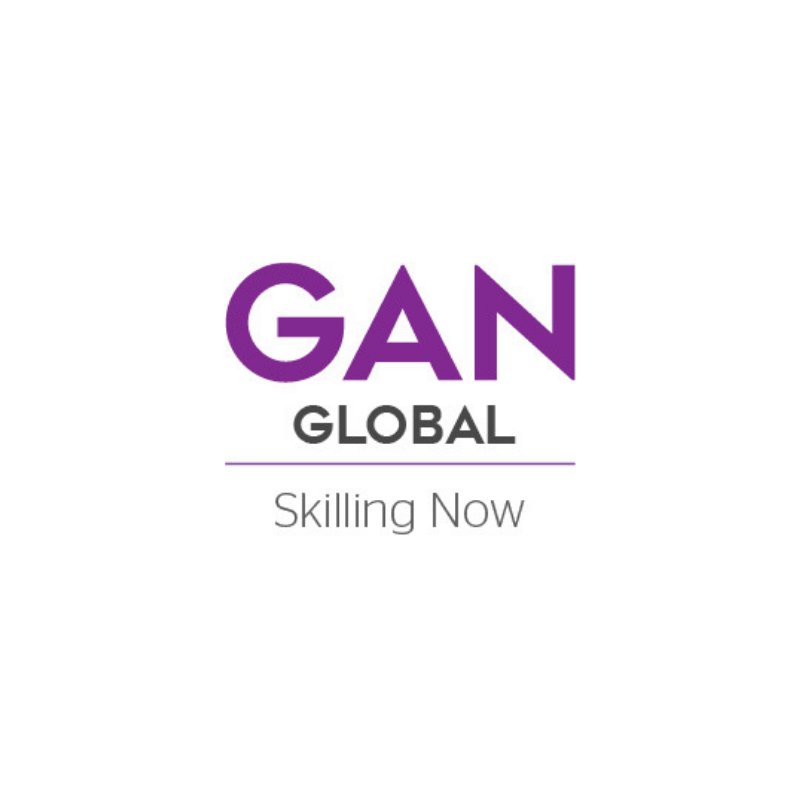
- GAN Logo
- Abbreviation: GAN
- Established: 2013
- Founder: Shea Gopaul
- Type: Swiss Not-for-profit Association
- Legal status: Active
- Headquarters: Geneva, Switzerland
- Website: www.gan-global.org

The Global Apprenticeship Network (GAN) is a Swiss independent and neutral not-for-profit association based in Geneva. The GAN is a network of companies, employer organisations, associations and international organisations with the mission of promoting quality apprenticeships and the goal of creating job opportunities for youth and ensuring skills for business.

== History ==
The Global Apprenticeship Network was created based on a call for action by the G20 countries on youth unemployment. It was established late 2013 as an initiative coordinated by the International Organisation of Employers and the Organisation of Economic Co-operation and Development’s (OECD) Business and Industry Advisory Committee, with the support of the International Labour Organization and OECD.

== Governance ==
The supreme decision-making body of the GAN is the general council, which brings together all of its members representing business and employer organisations. It meets at least once a year, and is responsible for approving the work of the Management Board, which formulates the general policy direction of the GAN, adopts a plan of action for the next year and assesses the previous year's work. The Secretariat, the body responsible for the day-to-day running of the GAN, is led by the executive director, currently Nazrene Mannie, who is accountable to the General Council and the Management Board.

== Activities ==
According to its annual report, the GAN develops toolkits, conducts surveys, shares best practices with multinationals and participates in international events.

The GAN works through its national networks which are the platform on the ground. As of April 2019 the GAN has launched fifteen National Networks in Australia, Guatemala, Bangladesh, Argentina, Colombia, Costa Rica, Mexico, Indonesia, Sri Lanka, Turkey, Belgium, France, Spain, Malawi, Tanzania, and Namibia.

== Members and partners ==
A full list of GAN members and partners is available on their website. The GAN, through its members, reaches out to labour and employment ministers in 185 countries and to more than 150 employers’ federations in every region of the world. The GAN membership consists of entities whose objectives are compatible with those of the GAN.
