= Bettina Freeman =

American opera singer

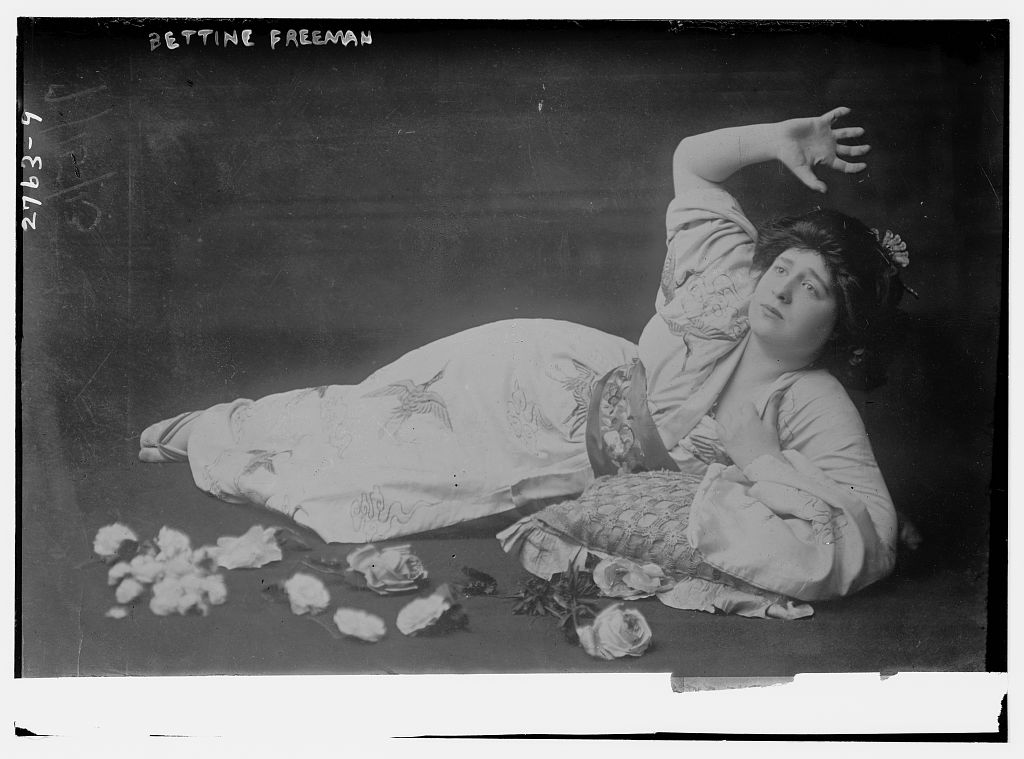
Bettina Freeman as Madame Butterfly, c. 1913

Bettina Freeman (1889–?) was an American opera singer with the San Carlo Opera Company who was active from 1911 to 1920.

== Biography ==
Bettina Freeman was born in Boston in 1889. Her mother was French and her father an American of German descent. She was educated in the public schools and began to take lessons on the piano at the age of thirteen, her teacher being Madame de Berg Lofgren, who began to teach her singing also when she was sixteen. When the Boston Opera enterprise was launched Madame Lofgren took her young pupil to the opera school, and after some coaching with Minetti and Conti, Freeman made her debut as Siebel in Faust, and sang with the Boston Opera Company for one season. Seeking an opportunity for larger parts she went to New York where she was engaged for the Quinlan Opera Company, and made a tour through England and Scotland, singing leading parts—Madame Butterfly, Micaela, Gretel—, and even singing Elizabeth in Tannhäuser, a role considered much too taxing for a young singer. Her voice was of mezzo-soprano quality with an unusual range. Freeman had a rather unusual study path, for in 1907, being consumed with the desire to study abroad, she went to Paris, took three or four lessons, was taken ill, and returned to Boston in time to resume her lessons, in the fall, with Madame Lofgren. She thus made her operatic debut with practically no European study or experience.

== Roles ==
- Tosca (1920)
- La Giaconda (1920)
