= Matthew J. Looram Jr. =

American diplomat (1921–2004)

Matthew James Looram Jr. (March 26, 1921 – March 16, 2004) was an American diplomat.

== Early life ==
Looram was born in New York City on March 26, 1921. He graduated from Harvard and served in the US Army, 13th Airborne Division.

== Career ==
A career Foreign Service Officer, he served as U.S. Ambassador Extraordinary and Plenipotentiary to Benin from 1969 until 1971 and U.S. Ambassador Extraordinary and Plenipotentiary to Somalia from 1972 to 1973.

== Personal life ==
In 1943, Looram was married to Bettina Jemima Rothschild (1924–2012), a daughter of Baron and Baroness Alphonse and Clarice de Rothschild. Together, they lived in Georgetown (Washington, D.C.) and were the parents of:

- Bettina Burr (born c. 1946), vice president of the board of trustees of the Museum of Fine Arts, Boston.

Looram died at his home in Langau, Austria on March 16, 2004, at the age of 82.
