= Shea Gopaul =

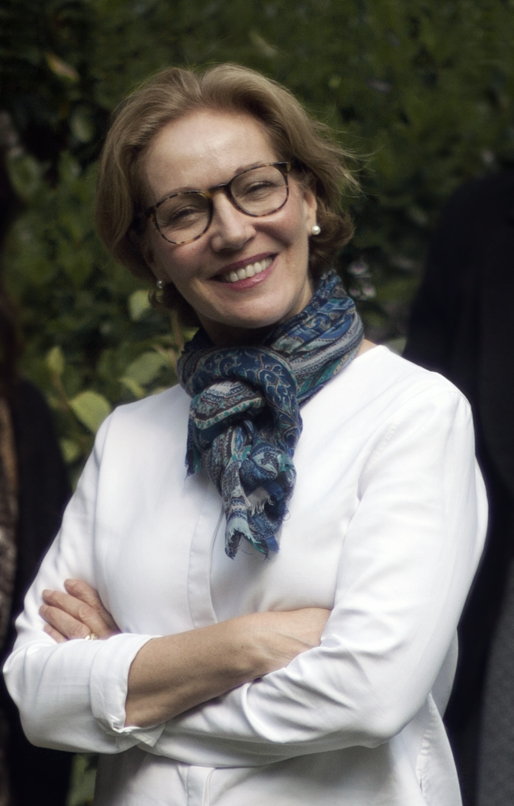
- Shea Gopaul in 2016

Permanent Representative to the United Nations for the International Organisation of Employers (IOE) and Founder - Global Apprenticeship Network

Shea Gopaul is a multinational strategist, working at the intersection of global business, governance and social impact. She is the Permanent Representative to the United Nations in New York for the International Organisation of Employers (IOE). She is also the Founder and former Executive Director Emeritus of the Global Apprenticeship Network (GAN), a coalition of companies and organizations addressing the skills mismatch and youth unemployment.

In her current role as the Permanent Representative (Ambassador) to the UN, she represents IOE which has affiliates in over 150 countries and represents 50 million companies. Gopaul ensures the voice of business of large and small companies including from Least Developed Countries are heard at the UN table. Gopaul is also the co-chair of the UN Business and Industry Major Group and represents business perspectives on various policy committees.

She is leading an initiative on inclusive multilateralism which tries to enhance private sector engagement and partnerships with several UN entities both at the global and national level. Through dialogues, publications, outreach and communications projects, the initiative seeks to stimulate collaboration and foster partnerships between the public and private sectors to achieve the Sustainable Development Goals (SDGs).

She is recognized as an IZA Fellow, a member of the G20/B20 Employment and Education Taskforce, a lifetime member of the Council on Foreign Relations, and a member of the President’s Advisory Council at Teachers College, Columbia University.

== Education ==
Shea Gopaul holds a Master's degree in International Education from Teacher's College, Columbia University, is an Institute for the Study of Labor Policy Fellow, and a recipient of an Honorary Doctorate in Humane Letters and undergraduate degree from Point Park University.

An accomplished classical ballet dancer, she remains active in the art world and is on the Board of Directors of Battery Dance Company in New York, which uses dance to foster intercultural exchange and understanding.

== Publications ==
Shea Gopaul led the preparation of a joint publication by the International Organisation of Employers (IOE), the Konrad Adenauer Stiftung (KAS) office in New York, and the UN Development Coordination Office (DCO) titled Playbook: Building Momentum in the Decade of Action through Collaboration between Employers and UN Resident Coordination. The Playbook aims to strengthen the dialogue and collaboration between Resident Coordinators (RCs) and employer organisations with the purpose of working together to achieve Sustainable Development Goals (SDGs). The Playbook provides RCs and employer organisations a guide with recommendations, best practices, useful tips on collaboration, and outlining roles and responsibilities.

In 2024 she led the work on a Playbook 2.0 on Creating Synergies between UN Resident Coordinators and Employers for Sustainable Impact.

In early 2013, Shea Gopaul led and authored an International Labour Organization (ILO) feasibility study to gather information from businesses about their apprenticeship programs and to seek their views on how an international business network on apprenticeships could add value for them. In collaboration with the International Organisation of Employers (IOE) and members of the World Economic Forum’s Global Agenda Council on Youth Unemployment, the feasibility study collected information from multi-stakeholders on country and company apprenticeship practices. It explored the interest and eventual commitment of companies to join forces to promote apprenticeships through a Global Apprenticeships Network. Shea Gopaul has coauthored several articles on apprenticeships, jobs, and other reskilling programs. She has been a regular voice on youth training, skilling and public partnerships at Davos, G20 OECD, UN and ILO.
