= Bettina von Arnim (artist) =

German painter

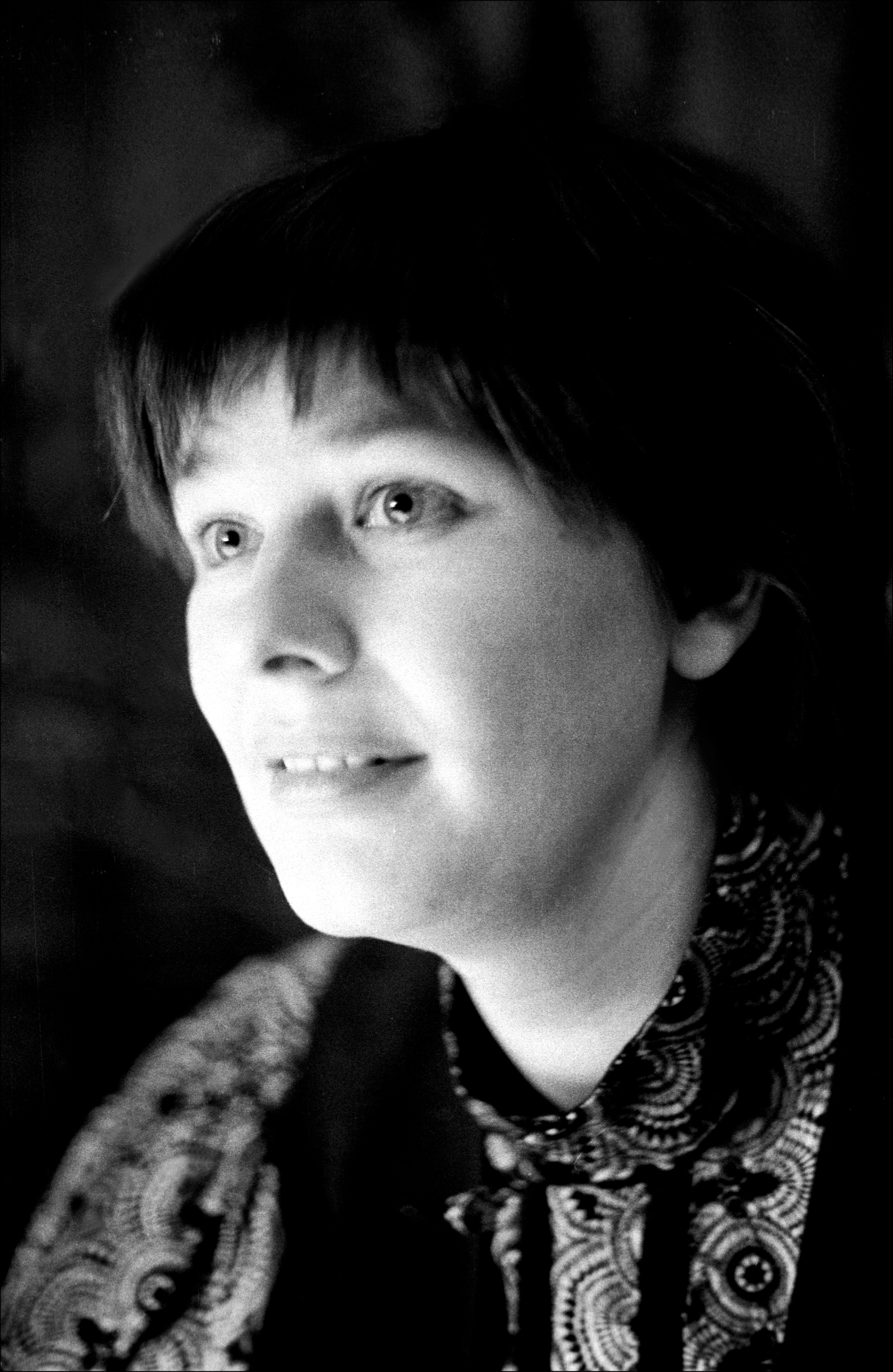
- Bettina von Arnim in 1975
- Born: 19 October 1940 (age 84)
- Occupation(s): New realist painter, illustrator and graphic artist

Bettina von Arnim (born October 19, 1940, in Zernikow) is a German-born new realist painter, illustrator and graphic artist.

== Life ==
=== Provenance and early childhood ===
Bettina von Arnim was born in the Brandenburg flatlands north of Berlin at Zernikow (as it was known at that time) where Baron Friedmund von Arnim (1897-1946), her father, was the local lord of the (by this time seriously indebted) manor. As matters turned out he was the last lord of the manor. She was the fifth of her parents' six children: the other five were all boys.

Through her father's family Bettina von Arnim is a great-granddaughter of the romantic author Bettina von Arnim (1785-1859). The artist Bettina Encke von Arnim (1895-1971) was her father's older sister. Her mother, born Klara von Hagens (1909-2009) came originally from Kassel. Clara von Arnim (as Bettina's mother became known) was a lawyer who became pharmacist and in 1998, late in her life, achieved success as an author. For the first five years of the young Bettina's life the family home was the "Schloss Wiepersdorf" where they lived with various relatives and house-guests. Bettina later discovered that several of the house guests were in hiding from the authorities, including the communist Iwan Katz (1889-1956), the artist Fritz Kuhr (1899-1975) and the woman whom the children knew as "Aunt Irma", a clever and serious person who helped Bettina's older brothers with their school work and sometimes read the children stories. "Aunt Irma" was the cover name for a Jewish woman whose husband was already being detained in a concentration camp. Another of the house-guests combined the skills of a dress-maker with those of an alternative medicines practitioner. She produced clothes for the children's mother, and was allowed the singular privilege of regularly playing the treasured family Bechstein (piano).

=== Expulsion ===
On 22 April 1945, a Sunday morning, the Russians came and the region found itself administered as part of the Soviet occupation zone. The family property was confiscated without compensation, and almost immediately adapted for use as a Soviet command post. Bettina's father was taken away. Two years later the family discovered that he had died in a prisoner of war camp at Tula in January 1946. (He had never been a soldier in Hitler's army, and had only been taken by the Soviets after the war had ended.) Clara von Arnim and the six children escaped to Berlin and from there fled towards the west, ending up living near Stuttgart in what later became the (West German) federal state of Baden-Württemberg.

=== Student ===
As a school girl growing up in Schwäbisch Hall she received a stipendium from the American Field Service which enabled her to spend a year in Cambridge, Massachusetts: she returned in 1958, passing her school finals (Abitur) the next year. Directly after leaving school she volunteered for hospital, in return for which she received her food and board. She was unsure what she should do with her life, but she had already sent some of her drawing and watercolours "to Berlin". These evidently found their way to Fritz Kuhr whose positive reply some weeks later, was delivered to her at the hospital ("Sisterlette Bedina, you have a letter from a Berlin professor!"). She moved on to study at the art-teaching department of the National Academy of Vusual Arts ("Staatlichen Hochschule für Bildende Künste" - as it was then known) in Berlin-Schöneberg (West Berlin) between 1960 and 1965. She studied under Fritz Kuhr, who was a long-standing friend of her artist-aunt, Bettina Encke von Arnim. She subsequently, still in West Berlin completed her teacher-training and following receipt of the necessary diploma supported herself through teaching. During her student career another stipendium enabled her to study for a time at the École des Beaux-Arts in Paris during 1962/63. The focus of her student work in Paris was on graphic reproduction: she was taught by Johnny Friedlaender.

=== Marriage and career ===
Bettina von Arnim married the artist Ulrich Baehr in 1966. Their daughters were born in West Berlin in 1970 and 1972. By 2016 there were grandchildren. The couple's daughter Antonia also grew up to become an artist.

The West Berlin years were artistically productive: her drawings and large-format oil paintings were on display at numerous exhibitions, such as those of the German Artists' Association (of which she became a member in 1973) and, between 1972 and 1978, of the new realist "Aspect Group" (of which von Arnim and her husband were founding members).

=== France ===
Following her divorce from Ulrich Baehr, which took place in 1975, Bettina von Arnim left West Berlin, relocating to south-western France accompanied by her daughters and the machinery for producing artistic prints that she had recently, not without difficulty, purchased. They moved into a house which she had acquired as a ruin and restored during her time in Paris.

Since 1991 Bettina von Arnim has lived and worked in a house with its own studio at Concots, a (very) small town in the hill country north of Toulouse.

== Work ==
Towards the end of the 1960s Bettina von Arnim began to warn against the "Power-grab of the technocrats" ("Machtergreifung der Technokraten"). (Note: The German word used for power-grab here was Machtergreifung which for audiences at that time would have come across as a conscious reference to the 1933 launch of the National Socialist period.) She was critical of industrialisation of the rural economy and of space exploration. Her large format oil paintings of the period feature machine-men and reference works of Rüdiger Proske such as "Zum Mond und weiter" ("To the moon and beyond"), "Optiman" and "Kyborg". There are also clear references to H. G. Wells in her 1970 work "Galactic General". She produced a succession of paintings of semi-transparent humanoid robots in fantastical outfits, with their internal organs replaced by tubes and funnels, becoming buried in the landscapes which they had themselves destroyed. She saw much earlier than most that much of the technical development that was being celebrated as progress towards human perfectability was no such thing, but a threat and de-humanising distortion that would put an end to human individuality. Representative of her output during this period are large format oil paintings such as "Kahlschlag" (loosely, "forest clearance"), and "Schacht" (loosely "strip mining") which show landscapes that have disappeared to be replaced by imagined Martian landscapes and characters formed of concrete patterns. "Das Muster als Monster" (loosely, "The pattern as monster") was the insightful headline for a critical review of an exhibition that included von Arnim pictures such as "Spuren" (loosely, "Tramlines"), "Mäanderthal" (loosely, "Maze valley") and "Städte-Meer" (loosely, "Lake city"). In 2014/15, by now aged nearly 75, Bettina van Arnim was brought to the attention of a new generation through the "German Pop" exhibition given in Frankfurt's Schirn Kunsthalle exhibition centre, which ran for three months between November 2014 and February 2015, resonating widely with critics and visitors.

== Exhibitions (selection) ==
- 1964: Galerie La Galère, Paris
- 1970: Galerie Poll, Berlin
- 1971: Galerie G. Kammer, Hamburg
- 1973: Galerie Ostentor, Dortmund
- 1973: Galerie Poll, Berlin
- 1976: Galerie Poll, Berlin
- 1976: Galerie Apex, Göttingen
- 1977: Centre Culturel de la Ville de Toulouse
- 1981: Kunstverein Augsburg
- 1982: Galerie Poll, Berlin
- 1983: Galerie in der Böttcherstraße, Bremen
- 1984: Studio Jaeschke, Bochum
- 1985: Neuer Berliner Kunstverein
- 1985: Galerie Poll, Berlin
- 1985: Städtische Galerie Haus Seel, Siegen
- 1986: Grenier du Chapitre, Cahors/Lot
- 1987–1990: Projekt Das Spiegel-Labyrinth, Cahors/Lot
- 1994–1995: Galerie Villa Bösenberg, Leipzig
- 1998: Kurt-Tucholsky-Gedenkstätte, Schloss Rheinsberg
- 2001: Bildkasten und Rostbilder, Gotische Halle, Ansbach
- 2005: Chateau de Saint-Cirq-Lapopie, Lot
- 2015: Mutanten und Meteorologen, Philipp Pflug Contemporary, Frankfurt am Main
- 2015: Countdown. Radierungen, Kunststiftung Poll, Berlin
- 2015: Die Cyborgs und ihre Spuren 1968-1983, Galerie Poll, Berlin

== Group exhibition participations (selection) ==
- 1963–1977: Große Kunstausstellung, Berlin
- 1968: Junge Berliner Graphik, Wanderausstellung
- 1969: Frankfurter Kunstverein
- 1971 Menschenbilder, Museum Pfalzgalerie Kaiserslautern
- 1973: Prinzip Realismus, Wanderausstellung (Berlin, Munich, Rome, Athens)
- 1974: Naivität der Maschine, Frankfurter Kunstverein
- 1974: Zerstörung der Umwelt, Haus am Lützowplatz, Berlin
- 1975: Der ausgegangene Mensch, Kunsthalle Mannheim
- 1977–1979: Aspekt Großstadt, Wanderausstellung (Berlin, Frankfurt, München, Edinburgh, London)
- 1979: Die Entfremdung der Stadt, Neuer Berliner Kunstverein in der Nationalgalerie, Berlin
- 1979: Salon d’Automne, Grand Palais, Paris
- 1982: Wer zeigt sein wahres Gesicht, Ruhrfestspiele, Recklinghausen
- 1983: Stadt und Utopie, Neuer Berliner Kunstverein in der Staatlichen Kunsthalle, Berlin
- 1984: 1984 – Orwell und die Gegenwart, Museum des 20. Jahrhunderts, Wien
- 1984: Zukunftsräume – Weltbilder und Bildwelten der Sciencefiction, Orangerie, Kassel
- 1987: Positionen des Realismus 1967 – 1972 – 1987, Galerie Poll, Berlin
- 1987: Mythos Berlin Concepte, Goethe-Institut, Paris
- 1990–1991: Vertrauen ins Bild, Museum Bochum; Stadtgalerie Kiel
- 1991: Internationale Graphik-Triennale, Krakau
- 1996: Kunst im Kasten, Westwendischer Kunstverein, Quarnstedt
- 2012: Aufbruch Realismus. Die Wirklichkeit im Bild nach ’68, Städtische Museen Heilbronn
- 2013: Auf Polls Spuren – Editionen aus 45 Jahren, Galerie Poll, Berlin
- 2014–2015: German Pop, Schirn Kunsthalle, Frankfurt am Main
- 2018: Flashes of the Future. Die Kunst der 68er oder die Macht der Ohnmächtigen, Ludwig Forum für Internationale Kunst, Aachen

== Works in public collections ==
- Berlinische Galerie, Berlin
- Sammlung Deutsche Bank, Frankfurt am Main
- Sammlung zeitgenössischer Kunst der Bundesrepublik Deutschland
- Städel Museum, Frankfurt am Main
- Kunstmuseum Bonn
- Landesmuseum Kiel
- Museum der Stadt Göteborg
- Museé de l’Automate, Souilliac
- Museé Champollion, Figeac
