= Bettina Sellmann =

German artist

Bettina Sellmann (born 1971) is a German artist.

From 1992 to 1997 Sellmann studied and graduated as Meisterschülerin (Master) at Städelschule Frankfurt. In 1999 she was awarded a DAAD grant for New York City, where she lived and worked until 2009. She currently lives and works in Berlin, Germany. Sellmann also holds a Master of Fine Arts degree from Hunter College, NYC.

In her paintings Sellmann uses a watercolor-on-canvas technique in "candy colored acrylic tones (bonbonbunte Acryltöne)" and “multi-layers of translucent pigments in pale pinks, powder blues, and acidic yellows and greens“. Works of her have been described as “see-through versions of Old Master paintings ... gone translucent and ethereal“, "particular reverie-inducers“, exploring “the other side of pink“.

Recent paintings deal with kidult and fairy tale "romanticism“ (Cassandra Neyenesch) as well as kawaii imagery and influences of Far Eastern spirituality.

At Wonderloch Kellerland Berlin in 2011 she performed a space clearing, which could be considered either an empty room or "a purely transcendent exhibition“.

She has works in private and public collections, such as the Museum of Modern Art, New York, which holds her drawing The Saints in This World Are Watching (2003).

== Awards ==
DAAD (German Academic Exchange Service) - Grant

Skowhegan Summer Residency Program

== Exhibitions ==
=== Solo exhibitions ===
- 2021 Easymagic123 (with Julia Jansen, poetry reading by Julia Mantel), Kunstverein Offenbach, Germany
- 2020 Easymagic123 (with Julia Jansen), Baustelle Schaustelle Düsseldorf and Essen, Germany
- 2019 Glam magic manufactoray (with René Luckhardt), Oberfinanzdirektion, Frankfurt/Main, Germany
- 2018 Dia-Ikone (with René Luckhardt), Weißfrauen Diakoniekirche, Frankfurt/Main, Germany
- 2017 Hello Color, Gilla Lörcher I Contemporary Art, Berlin, Germany
- 2016 It's already there, Gilla Lörcher I Contemporary Art, Berlin, Germany
- 2015 US Paintings, Gilla Lörcher I Contemporary Art, Berlin, Germany
- 2015 Spiral, Square and Dickie-Bow, Wolfstädter Galerie, Frankfurt, Germany
- 2013 To Queen Luise & Young-Wilhelm, Wonderloch Kellerland, Berlin, Germany
- 2013 Magic Every Day, Gilla Lörcher I Contemporary Art, Berlin, Germany
- 2011 Bettina Sellmann @ Kaisersaal, ISI/Potsdamer Platz, Berlin, Germany
- 2011 Templeloch Space Clearing, Wonderloch Kellerland, Berlin, Germany
- 2009 Taina, cosmogeny, make your own paper dragon, Derek Eller Gallery, New York, NY, USA
- 2007 Galerie Frank Schlag, Essen, Germany
- 2006 Derek Eller Gallery, New York, NY, USA
- 2004 Armor & Etiquette, Derek Eller Gallery, New York, NY, USA
- 2004 Drawings, Derek Eller Gallery, New York, NY, USA

=== Group exhibitions ===
- 2023 PORTRAIT I, Galerie Tammen, Berlin, Germany
- 2023 FOYOU 7, Marienburg, Berlin, Germany
- 2023 MISSTORY, Kunstverein Familie Montez, Frankfurt/Main, Germany
- 2023 Alptraum at Polarraum, Hamburg, Germany
- 2022 Hypnopomp, Hilbertraum, Berlin, Germany
- 2022 außer sich, inner ich, Inselgalerie Berlin, Germany
- 2022 WAN(N) DA, Galerie Greulich, Frankfurt/Main, Germany
- 2022 Essence of Color – Blue, Städtische Galerie im Leeren Beutel, Regensburg, Germany
- 2022 Kick Line, Thaler Originalgrafik, Leipzig, Germany
- 2022 North Oversee, Kunsthalle Wilhelmshaven, Germany
- 2021 100 unter 1000, Schindler LAB, Potsdam, Germany
- 2021 Popup Pickup, Works by 180 international artists on magnets, Lübeck, Germany
- 2021 Stubenausstellung, Kunstraum Dietz, Cologne, Germany
- 2020 Sweet Nothing Sweet, Kunstverein KISS, Abtsgmünd-Untergröningen, Germany
- 2020 (No)body is perfect, Galerie 21.06, Ravensburg, Germany
- 2020 Alptraum, TAM Torrance Art Museum, California, USA
- 2019 Voix, Museum of Fine Arts (MdbK), Leipzig, Germany
- 2019 Paint: The Seen, the Unseen and the Imagined, Messums Wiltshire, Tisbury, UK
- 2019 Alptraum, La Estacion Gallery, Chihuahua, Mexico
- 2018 AIM Project, Parallel Art Fair Vienna, Austria
- 2018 Die Jahrhundert-Bar, Projektraum Ventilator, Berlin, Germany
- 2018 8 Frauen, Galerie 21.06, Ravensburg, Germany
- 2018 Zündung, Turps Gallery, London, UK
- 2018 Das Schöne Zimmer, Alexander Ochs Private, Berlin, Germany
- 2018 Painting XXL, Galerie Leuenroth, Frankfurt/Main, Germany
- 2018 Diaikone, Weißfrauenkirche, Frankfurt am Main, Germany
- 2016 Animalism, Galerie Bernd Kugler, Innsbruck, Austria
- 2016 Blanke Teile, Malerinnennetzwerk Berlin-Leipzig, Schaufenster, Berlin, Germany
- 2015 1. Berlin Edition, Salon Dahlmann, Berlin, Germany
- 2014 Die Leipziger Edition, Wiensowski & Harbord, Berlin, Germany
- 2014 Painting Was A Lady, Wonderloch Kellerland, New York City, USA
- 2013 Berlin–Klondyke, Spinnerei Leipzig, Germany
- 2012 Everywhere and Nowhere, Works from the Collection Reydan Weiss - Kunsthaus Villa Jauss, Oberstdorf, Germany
- 2012 Alptraum, Green Papaya Art Project, Metropolitan Museum of Manila, Manila, Philippines
- 2012 Painting Was A Lady, Vienna Art Foundation, Kunstraum am Schauplatz, Vienna, Austria
- 2011 Soiree Matinee, Wonderloch Kellerland, Los Angeles, USA
- 2010 Talk Show, Edward Thorp Gallery, New York, NY, USA
- 2009 Drawn, Kinkead Contemporary, Los Angeles, CA, USA
- 2009 Figuratively Seeing, Massachusetts College of Art and Design, Boston, MA, USA
- 2009 Tales of Wonder and Woe, Castle Gallery, New Rochelle, NY, USA
- 2008 The Golden Record, The Collective Gallery, Edinburgh, UK
- 2006 Flicker, University Art Museum, Albany, NY, USA
- 2005 Hello Sunday, Sixtyseven/Thierry Goldberg Gallery, New York, NY, USA
- 2004 Under the Sun, Greener Pastures Gallery, Toronto, Canada
- 2003 Girls Gone Wild, Bronwyn Keenan Gallery, New York, NY, USA
- 2002 Fredericks Freiser Gallery, New York, NY, USA
- 2001 Groupshow, American Fine Arts, New York, NY, USA
