= Bettina Hauge =

Danish anthropologist

Bettina Hauge (born 1964) is a Danish anthropologist whose work is concerned with the social implications of natural phenomena such as wind, water and above all light. After being employed for several years as a researcher at the Technical University of Denmark, in February 2016 she was appointed scientific officer at Innovation Fund Denmark, an organisation focused on creating new initiatives for growth and employment in Denmark.

== Biography ==
Born on 5 December 1964, Hauge attended Tårnby Gymnasium and Skottegaardsskolen in Kastrup before studying economics at the Copenhagen Business School where she graduated in 1992. She then went on to study anthropology at the University of Copenhagen in 1996, leading to an M.Sc. in 2002. Thereafter she earned two doctorates (a Ph.D. in 2008 and a Post.doc in 2011), both from Copenhagen University.

In addition to her work as a researcher at the University of Copenhagen, Hauge has been a project manager with Schneider Electric, Denmark (2007–09), resulting in substantial improvements to their products. While working as a consultant for VELUX (2009–15), she completed work on an "Anthropological study and analysis of the importance of outside fresh air in the home". At the Technical University of Denmark (2012–16), she included the importance of user experience among her courses on management engineering.

As an anthropologist, Hauge has focused her work on the social effects of natural phenomena, especially how they impact people's everyday lives. Her work has included an analysis of how Germans and Danes view the importance of daylight as a basis for emphasizing the importance of light in a socio-cultural context.

== Selected publications ==
Hauge's publications include the following:

- Hauge, Bettina (2010). The Significance of Fresh Air from Outside : Getting to Know the World Through Air (PDF). University of Copenhagen.
- Hauge, Bettina (2008). Kræftramte - på arbejde : betydninger af et arbejdsliv for livstruende syge (PDF). University of Copenhagen.
- Hauge, Bettina (2013). The significance of the window - a qualitative, anthropological study of what the window means to people: Report. University of Copenhagen.
