= Bettina Cirone =

American photographer (1933–2026)

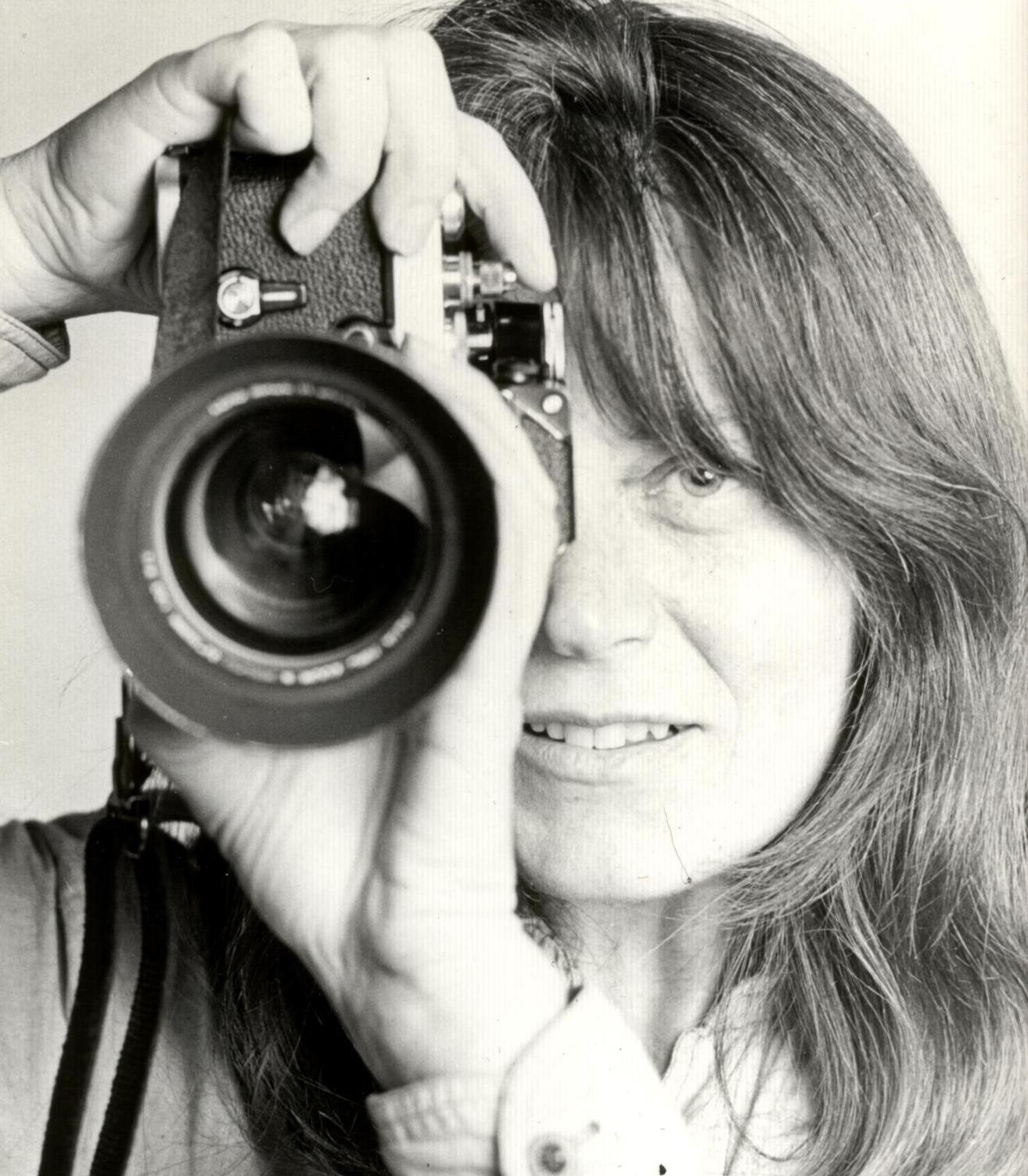
- Born: August 19, 1933; New York City, U.S.
- Died: April 3, 2026 (aged 92); New York City, U.S.
- Known for: Model, photographer

Bettina L. Cirone (August 19, 1933 – April 3, 2026) was an American photographer, interviewer, and Ford model. Cirone took photographs of celebrities; including actors, musicians, artists, politicians in the United States and internationally from about 1970 on. Her works have appeared in magazines, newspapers, books, and at the Solomon R. Guggenheim Museum. A retrospective of her work was held in Norwich, Connecticut, in 1995 at the New England Museum for Contemporary Art.

== Life and career ==
=== Background ===
Bettina L. Cirone was born on August 19, 1933. She died of natural causes at her home in New York City, on April 3, 2026, at the age of 92.

=== Model ===
Cirone was a Ford model in the 1960s, during which she modeled for major fashion magazines. She modeled for, and was a friend of, Salvador Dalí, who gave her prints that he personally autographed, along with a copy of his book, Diary of a Genius, signed "Pour mon amie Bettina, Hommage Dalí, 1966," and includes a pen sketch of Don Quixote. The book was sold in the late 2000s. Another was a framed print of a blue lion that signed "Pour Bettina". It, along with another print that Dali gave her, was stolen in 2014.

=== Photographer ===
Cirone started working as a photojournalist around 1970, when she was hired during New York City Mayor John Lindsay's administration and assigned to the Lower Manhattan Development City Planning Commission to shoot landmarks in downtown Manhattan. In the early 70's she gravitated to capturing images of celebrities like Alec Baldwin, Sigourney Weaver, Kim Basinger, Ben Vereen, Michael Douglas, and Gregory Hines. Her photographs have appeared in publications, like Daily News, Newsday, People magazine, New York Magazine, Jet, New York Newsday, The New York Post, and American Photo. She has also taken photographs of political figures. For two years she was the official photographer for New York City Mayor John Lindsay. She has also photographed Ted Kennedy, Jacqueline Kennedy Onassis, John F. Kennedy Jr. and Caroline Kennedy. Cirone, who photographed Carolyn Bessette-Kennedy and John F. Kennedy, commented that Bissette "succeeded in souring some of his sweetness". She was a contributor to the Vernon Jordan portrait collection held at the New York Public Library.

Cirone worked as much as 18 hours each day. She took photographs backstage after performances, like the image of Douglas, Weaver, Hines and Vereen after Jelly's Last Jam. She was described as a paparazza. Cirone was hired to photograph Joan Crawford in her apartment for Architectural Digest.

During an assignment for USA Today, to photograph Peter Boyle, Timothy Hutton and Robert Culp at a pre-production party for Turk 182, Cirone was interviewed about her career. She described her preference to photograph celebrities when they are "willing to be photographed", like at celebrity events. One roll of black and white film that she took of Dustin Hoffman trying on hats for Death of a Salesman is one of the most well-published works. In January 1986, her images were produced for a Playboy pictorial essay entitled "Grapevine: Reviving a Dead Salesman".

Many of her images have been personally autographed by the celebrities that she has photographed, like two signed photographs of Andy Warhol that had been taken by Cirone at Studio 54 with author and playwright Tennessee Williams. Pictures of George Clooney, Mary Tyler Moore holding Cirone's cat, and Mia Farrow are a few of the photographs in Cirone's home. International artists that she's portrayed include Jordi Aluma and Erté.

Her works have appeared in books, such as Urban Design as Public Policy, There's No Place Like Home: Confessions of an Interior Designer, Human Biology, and Hollywood Royalty: Hepburn, Davis, Stewart, and Friends at the Dinner Party of the Century. A retrospective of her work was exhibited in 1995 in Norwich, Connecticut at the New England Museum for Contemporary Art. It was curated by Baird Jones, who said that she has been "one of New York's most durable celeb photographers."

Cirone donated photographs or other material to the Skyscraper Museum for WTC: MONUMENT, a memorial to the World Trade Center. She was also one of the witnessing photographers that captured "the wrenching images, the fears and sorrows, the reconciliation, the extraordinary drive and devotion" following the 2001 World Trade Center disaster for Aileen Ghee's Witnessing documentary and Here is New York photograph exhibit. The proceeds benefited World Trade Center victims through the Children's Aid Society. In 2013, Cirone donated to the International Women's Media Foundation.

=== Interviewer ===
Cirone was regular New York Post contributor and has been a celebrity interviewer for World Liberty TV. She and Debbie Tuma were interviewers at Innerview in the Hamptons during many benefits including the Watermill Center benefit in 1996 in Long Island, New York. People interviewed included Demi Moore, Susan Sontag, and Robert Wilson.

Cirone's photograph of Morgan Freeman posing with his granddaughter E'Dena Hines was featured on the front page of the New York Post August 17, 2015.
