= Bettina Tucci Bartsiotas =

American politician

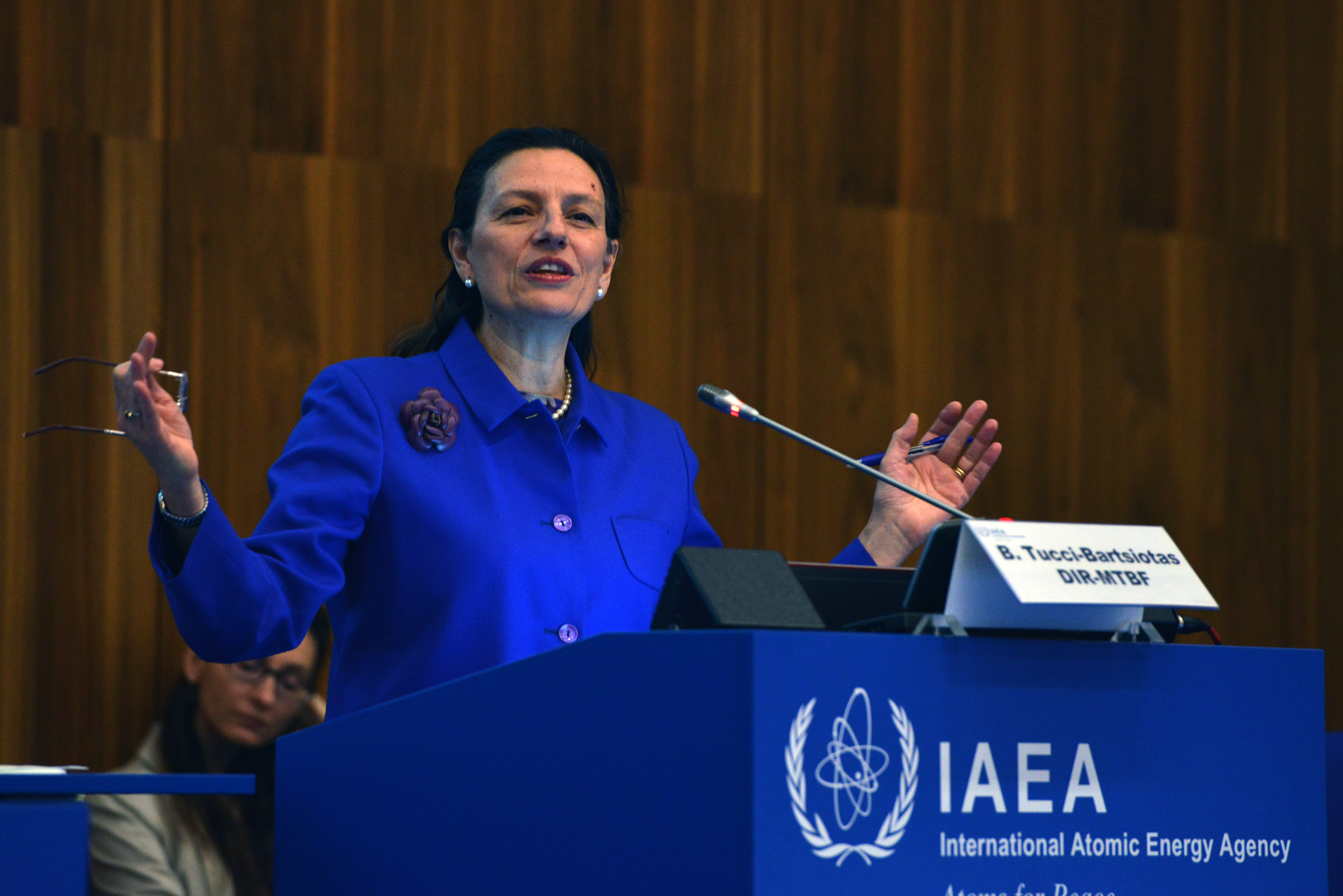

Bettina Tucci Bartsiotas was Assistant Secretary-General in the United Nations Department of Management's Office of Programme Planning, Budget and Accounts and Controller of the UN. Prior to this appointment on 30 October 2014 by United Nations Secretary-General Ban Ki-moon, Bartsiotas held a number of senior level positions in programme planning, budgeting and financial management.

== Career ==
Born in Uruguay, Bartsiotas is a United States national. In 1979, she received a Bachelor of Arts degree in Economics and Business Administration from American University, and in 1982, she received a Master of Business Administration in Finance and Investments from George Washington University. Bartsiostas has an extensive record of private and public service:

- Economic and Social Development Department, Inter-American Development Bank (Washington D.C., 1975–1980)
- Certified Public Accountant (Chevy Chase, Maryland, 1984–1992)
- Section Head, Programme and Resources, Department of Safeguards, International Atomic Energy Agency's (IAEA) (Vienna, Austria, 1994–2008)
- Deputy Director and Head of Budget, Division of Financial and Administrative Management, United Nations Children's Fund (UNICEF) (New York, New York, 2008–2011)
- Chief Financial Officer and Director, Division of Budget and Finance, IAEA (Vienna, Austria, 2011–2015)

While working at the Inter-American Development Bank, she met her husband George Bartsiotas who later became a member of the UN Joint Inspection Unit.
