= Bettina Meiser =

Australian geneticist

- Education: University of Sydney
- Known for: Genetic counselling
- Scientific career
- Fields: Cancer genetics, clinical and counselling psychology and psychiatry
- Workplaces: University of New South Wales
- Thesis: Psychological characteristics and breast screening behaviours of women at increased risk of developing breast cancer and the impact of genetic counselling and testing (2000)

Bettina Meiser is an Australian geneticist. She is a professor at the University of New South Wales, with expertise in the psychosocial aspects of genetics; cancer, hereditary cancer, and the impact of genetic counselling and testing.

== Career ==
Meiser has a BAppSc, BA (Hons) and PhD (Syd). She is the Head of the Psychosocial Research Group, at the Prince of Wales Clinical School. She holds a National Health and Medical Research Council (NHMRC) Senior Research Fellowship Level B in addition to multiple research grants from the NHMRC, Australian Research Council, Cancer Australia, NSW Cancer Council, Cancer Institute NSW and the APEX Foundation for Research into Intellectual Disabilities. Meiser has built a nationally and internationally recognised research program that assesses the psychosocial impact of genetic counselling and testing for hereditary disease; psychological adjustment of individuals at risk for hereditary disease; and the design and evaluation of interventions in the cancer genetic counselling setting, in particular decision aids as an innovative means of patient education. She leads a Psychosocial research group at the University of New South Wales.

Her specific fields of research include cancer genetics, health, Clinical and Counselling Psychology and Psychiatry (incl. psychotherapy).

Meiser was lead on a project, which developed a website with UNSW, Neuroscience Research Australia (NeuRA) and collaborators at other universities to address a gap in treatment of psychiatric treatment that is currently not available to people concerned about their own or family members’ vulnerability to depression.

“There aren’t really any specialised genetic counsellors who cover psychiatric illnesses in Australia”, she said in an interview, in 2019. “The vast majority of genetic counsellors do prenatal genetic counselling or cancer genetic counselling. So we identified a gap and for that reason we set up this website to cater for what we believe is a sizeable group of people.”

== Awards and recognition ==
Meiser has been awarded the following NHMRC grants:

- Principal investigator of Psychosocial aspects of genetic testing and counselling
- Principal investigator of Psychosocial implications of genetic counselling and testing
- Principal investigator of Genetic screening for haemochromatosis: determinants of uptake of population based screening
- Principal investigator of a randomised trial of a decision aid for women at increased risk for ovarian cancer
- Participant in Psychosocial predictors of developing breast cancer in women from high risk breast cancer families.

Her scientific standing is demonstrated by her contributions to the following scientific boards, ethics and research committees:

- Executive Advisory Board, Breast Cancer Campaign, United Kingdom, since 2012
- Psychosocial Section Editor, European Journal of Human Genetics, since 2011
- Member of Editorial Board, Familial Cancer, since 2013
- Member of Scientific Committee for International Meetings on Psychosocial Aspects of Hereditary Cancer, since 2007
- Chair, Human Research Ethics Committee, The Cancer Council of New South Wales, 2003–2012
- Cancer Research Committee, The Cancer Council of New South Wales, 2008–2012
- Secretary, Ethical and Social Issues Committee, Human Genetics Society of Australasia, 2005–2012
- Scientific Advisory Committee, Psycho-Oncology Cooperative Group (PoCoG), 2007–2010

== Media ==
Meiser was interviewed about her work on fears of depression due to genes, based on her work published in the journal BMC Psychiatry. Her work on risk of depression was published in Lab+Life Scientist magazine. The website for family depression and its production are described in a video by Good Eye Dear.
