= Bettina Burr =

American museum trustee

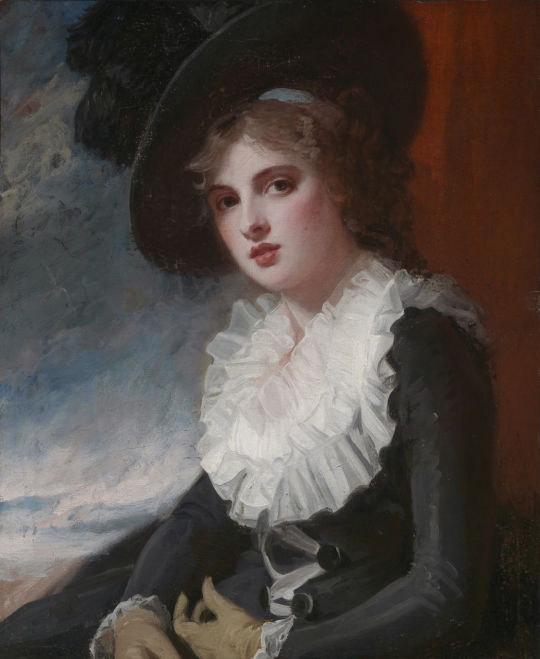
George Romney, Portrait of Emma Hart. Oil on canvas, c. 1784. Rothschild collection, Museum of Fine Arts, Boston.

Bettina "Nina" Burr (born c. 1946) is vice president of the board of trustees of the Museum of Fine Arts, Boston, to which she and other members of her family made a major donation of Rothschild family heirlooms that is known as The Rothschild Collection.

== Family ==
Burr was born Bettina Looram, around 1946. She is the daughter of Bettina Jemima Looram (née Rothschild) (1924–2012) and Matthew J. Looram, Jr. (died 2004), an American diplomat, who married in 1943. She is the granddaughter of Baron and Baroness Alphonse and Clarice de Rothschild, and great-granddaughter of Baron Albert Salomon Anselm von Rothschild of the Vienna branch of the Rothschild family. Burr is a former teacher.

== Museum of Fine Arts, Boston ==
Burr's association with the Museum of Fine Arts, Boston, began after she became a tour guide there. She later helped to catalog the museum's Japanese woodblock prints. She first became an overseer, then in 2006 a trustee of the museum. She is now vice president of the board of trustees and the Museum Representative to the Foundation for the Arts, Nagoya.

Some time after 2012, Burr and other heirs of Bettina Looram donated a collection of 186 objects, originally in the collection of Alphonse and Clarice de Rothschild, that were looted by the Nazis following the Austrian Anschluss with Germany in 1938. The museum has named the gift The Rothschild Collection. It includes, paintings, jewellery, prints and drawings, furniture, and books. The Nazis seized nearly 3,500 items from the Vienna Rothschilds, many intended for Adolf Hitler's planned Führermuseum that would have been located in the Austrian city of Linz had it been built. The looted items were stored in the Austrian salt mines of Altaussee where they were discovered by the Allies after the war.

In order to export the bulk of the collection to the United States, where Clarice de Rothschild then lived, she was required to donate around 250 items to the Austrian government. These items were not recovered by the family until a change in Austrian law in 1999, long after Alphonse and Clarice de Rothschild had died. Many of the recovered items were then sold at auction in London in a sale that realised a record at that time of over £57m. The items donated to the Boston museum come mainly from the items recovered in 1999 that were not sold because they had particular family meaning. The jewellery included in the donation was never in Nazi hands because Clarice de Rothschild and her husband had been in London at the time of the Anschluss and she had had the jewellery with her.

Among the items given to the Museum was George Romney's Portrait of Emma Hart, later Lady Hamilton, mistress of Lord Nelson and muse to Romney. Investigations have shown this to be the primary version of the work.

== See also ==
- Judith H. Dobrzynski
- Nazi plunder
