= Bettina Belitz =

German writer and journalist (born 1973)

Bettina Belitz (Heidelberg, September 21, 1973) is a German writer and journalist.

After studying history and literature, she worked for Die Rheinpfalz and other publications.

She has a son, and currently lives in Westerwald.

== Works ==
- Splitterherz Script 5, Bindlach 2010.
- Scherbenmond. (2. Teil) Script 5, Bindlach 2011
- Dornenkuss. (3. Teil) Script 5, Bindlach 2011
- Sturmsommer. Thienemann, Stuttgart 2010
- Freihändig. Thienemann, Stuttgart 2010
- Fiona Spiona. Bd. 1. Falsch gedacht, Herr Katzendieb! Loewe, Bindlach 2010
- Fiona Spiona. Bd. 2. Ein Hering mit fiesen Gedanken. Loewe, Bindlach 2010.
- Fiona Spiona. Bd. 3. Ein Popo geistert umher. Loewe, Bindlach 2010
- Fiona Spiona. Bd. 4. Kapitän Feinripp geht baden. Loewe, Bindlach 2010
- Fiona Spiona. Bd. 5. Angriff der Rollmöpse. Loewe, Bindlach 2011
- Fiona Spiona. Bd. 6. 8 Weihnachtsmänner sind einer zu viel. Loewe, Bindlach 2011
- Luzie & Leander. Bd. 1. Verflucht himmlisch. Loewe, Bindlach 2010
- Luzie & Leander. Bd. 2. Verdammt feurig. Loewe, Bindlach 2010
- Luzie & Leander. Bd. 3. Verzwickt chaotisch. Loewe, Bindlach 2011
- Luzie & Leander. Bd. 4. Verblüffend stürmisch. Loewe, Bindlach 2011
- Luzie & Leander. Bd. 5. Verwünscht gefährlich. Loewe, Bindlach 2012
