= List of minor planets: 436001–437000 =

The following is a partial list of minor planets, running from minor-planet number 436001 through 437000, inclusive. The primary data for this and other partial lists is based on JPL's "Small-Body Orbital Elements" and data available from the Minor Planet Center. Critical list information is also provided by the MPC, unless otherwise specified from Lowell Observatory. A detailed description of the table's columns and additional sources are given on the main page including a complete list of every page in this series, and a statistical break-up on the dynamical classification of minor planets.

Also see the summary list of all named bodies in numerical and alphabetical order, and the corresponding naming citations for the number range of this particular list. New namings may only be added to this list after official publication, as the preannouncement of names is condemned by the Working Group for Small Bodies Nomenclature of the International Astronomical Union.

Near-Earth obj.	MBA (inner)	MBA (outer)	Centaur
Mars-crosser	MBA (middle)	Jupiter trojan	Trans-Neptunian obj.
Unclassified

== 436001–436100 ==
Designation			Discovery			Properties		Ref
Permanent	Provisional	Named after	Date	Site	Discoverer(s)	Category	Diam.	Ref
436001	2009 FR_{50}	—	March 28, 2009	Kitt Peak	Spacewatch	·	2.8 km	MPC · JPL
436002	2009 FF_{51}	—	March 28, 2009	Kitt Peak	Spacewatch	·	2.9 km	MPC · JPL
436003	2009 FQ_{56}	—	March 23, 2009	Siding Spring	SSS	·	4.6 km	MPC · JPL
436004	2009 FA_{59}	—	March 22, 2009	Mount Lemmon	Mount Lemmon Survey	·	2.1 km	MPC · JPL
436005	2009 FD_{71}	—	March 29, 2009	Kitt Peak	Spacewatch	T_{j} (2.91)	4.1 km	MPC · JPL
436006	2009 FZ_{75}	—	March 24, 2009	Mount Lemmon	Mount Lemmon Survey	EOS	2.3 km	MPC · JPL
436007	2009 GS_{2}	—	April 13, 2009	Altschwendt	W. Ries	LIX	4.3 km	MPC · JPL
436008	2009 GG_{6}	—	April 2, 2009	Kitt Peak	Spacewatch	URS	3.7 km	MPC · JPL
436009	2009 HN_{1}	—	April 17, 2009	Kitt Peak	Spacewatch	·	3.5 km	MPC · JPL
436010	2009 HF_{11}	—	April 18, 2009	Mount Lemmon	Mount Lemmon Survey	·	3.7 km	MPC · JPL
436011	2009 HR_{16}	—	March 16, 2009	Kitt Peak	Spacewatch	EOS	1.8 km	MPC · JPL
436012	2009 HH_{17}	—	April 18, 2009	Kitt Peak	Spacewatch	·	2.5 km	MPC · JPL
436013	2009 HN_{20}	—	March 26, 2003	Kitt Peak	Spacewatch	HYG	2.9 km	MPC · JPL
436014	2009 HX_{22}	—	April 17, 2009	Kitt Peak	Spacewatch	·	3.5 km	MPC · JPL
436015	2009 HS_{29}	—	April 19, 2009	Kitt Peak	Spacewatch	·	3.1 km	MPC · JPL
436016	2009 HA_{30}	—	April 19, 2009	Kitt Peak	Spacewatch	·	2.8 km	MPC · JPL
436017	2009 HZ_{30}	—	April 19, 2009	Kitt Peak	Spacewatch	·	3.5 km	MPC · JPL
436018	2009 HN_{34}	—	March 17, 2009	Kitt Peak	Spacewatch	·	2.9 km	MPC · JPL
436019	2009 HY_{38}	—	April 18, 2009	Kitt Peak	Spacewatch	·	3.6 km	MPC · JPL
436020	2009 HF_{53}	—	March 28, 2009	Kitt Peak	Spacewatch	·	2.8 km	MPC · JPL
436021	2009 HV_{55}	—	April 21, 2009	Mount Lemmon	Mount Lemmon Survey	·	3.4 km	MPC · JPL
436022	2009 HR_{62}	—	April 22, 2009	Kitt Peak	Spacewatch	HYG	2.5 km	MPC · JPL
436023	2009 HF_{65}	—	March 24, 2009	Mount Lemmon	Mount Lemmon Survey	·	2.8 km	MPC · JPL
436024	2009 HL_{67}	—	April 20, 2009	Mount Lemmon	Mount Lemmon Survey	·	3.4 km	MPC · JPL
436025	2009 HZ_{73}	—	April 19, 2009	Catalina	CSS	·	3.3 km	MPC · JPL
436026	2009 HN_{78}	—	March 29, 2009	Kitt Peak	Spacewatch	·	2.4 km	MPC · JPL
436027	2009 HP_{79}	—	March 2, 2009	Mount Lemmon	Mount Lemmon Survey	EOS	2.1 km	MPC · JPL
436028	2009 HJ_{81}	—	April 21, 2009	Catalina	CSS	T_{j} (2.95)	3.7 km	MPC · JPL
436029	2009 HL_{90}	—	April 19, 2009	Mount Lemmon	Mount Lemmon Survey	·	3.2 km	MPC · JPL
436030	2009 JO_{2}	—	May 13, 2009	Mount Lemmon	Mount Lemmon Survey	ATE	300 m	MPC · JPL
436031	2009 JV_{2}	—	February 20, 2009	Mount Lemmon	Mount Lemmon Survey	·	4.8 km	MPC · JPL
436032	2009 JE_{5}	—	May 14, 2009	Kitt Peak	Spacewatch	·	5.1 km	MPC · JPL
436033	2009 KF_{11}	—	May 25, 2009	Kitt Peak	Spacewatch	CYB	5.6 km	MPC · JPL
436034	2009 KD_{16}	—	May 26, 2009	Kitt Peak	Spacewatch	·	3.0 km	MPC · JPL
436035	2009 KJ_{22}	—	May 31, 2009	Cerro Burek	Burek, Cerro	AMO	340 m	MPC · JPL
436036	2009 MK_{7}	—	June 27, 2009	Catalina	CSS	·	1.2 km	MPC · JPL
436037	2009 NJ	—	July 11, 2009	La Sagra	OAM	APO	650 m	MPC · JPL
436038	2009 OR_{9}	—	July 27, 2009	La Sagra	OAM	·	720 m	MPC · JPL
436039	2009 OE_{24}	—	July 27, 2009	Kitt Peak	Spacewatch	·	770 m	MPC · JPL
436040	2009 PO	—	August 12, 2009	Dauban	Kugel, F.	·	700 m	MPC · JPL
436041	2009 PU_{7}	—	June 24, 2009	Mount Lemmon	Mount Lemmon Survey	·	680 m	MPC · JPL
436042	2009 PU_{8}	—	August 15, 2009	Catalina	CSS	·	540 m	MPC · JPL
436043	2009 PZ_{11}	—	August 15, 2009	Catalina	CSS	·	740 m	MPC · JPL
436044	2009 PM_{12}	—	August 15, 2009	Catalina	CSS	·	710 m	MPC · JPL
436045	2009 PD_{17}	—	August 15, 2009	Kitt Peak	Spacewatch	·	740 m	MPC · JPL
436046	2009 QB_{19}	—	August 17, 2009	Kitt Peak	Spacewatch	·	1.2 km	MPC · JPL
436047	2009 QM_{21}	—	August 19, 2009	La Sagra	OAM	·	790 m	MPC · JPL
436048 Fritzhuber	2009 QE_{26}	Fritzhuber	August 20, 2009	Gaisberg	Gierlinger, R.	·	670 m	MPC · JPL
436049	2009 QE_{30}	—	August 24, 2009	Andrushivka	Andrushivka	·	750 m	MPC · JPL
436050	2009 QO_{42}	—	August 26, 2009	La Sagra	OAM	·	660 m	MPC · JPL
436051	2009 QW_{45}	—	August 26, 2009	La Sagra	OAM	·	970 m	MPC · JPL
436052	2009 RY_{5}	—	August 19, 2009	Kitt Peak	Spacewatch	V	720 m	MPC · JPL
436053	2009 RE_{6}	—	September 14, 2009	Dauban	Kugel, F.	·	1.0 km	MPC · JPL
436054	2009 RC_{14}	—	September 12, 2009	Kitt Peak	Spacewatch	V	620 m	MPC · JPL
436055	2009 RK_{26}	—	September 13, 2009	Socorro	LINEAR	·	730 m	MPC · JPL
436056	2009 RD_{27}	—	August 18, 2009	Kitt Peak	Spacewatch	·	740 m	MPC · JPL
436057	2009 RG_{34}	—	September 3, 2008	Kitt Peak	Spacewatch	L4	7.5 km	MPC · JPL
436058	2009 RE_{41}	—	September 15, 2009	Kitt Peak	Spacewatch	·	1.6 km	MPC · JPL
436059	2009 RE_{54}	—	September 15, 2009	Kitt Peak	Spacewatch	V	580 m	MPC · JPL
436060	2009 RJ_{61}	—	November 20, 2006	Kitt Peak	Spacewatch	·	820 m	MPC · JPL
436061	2009 RR_{64}	—	September 15, 2009	Kitt Peak	Spacewatch	L4	6.6 km	MPC · JPL
436062	2009 RC_{68}	—	September 15, 2009	Kitt Peak	Spacewatch	V	550 m	MPC · JPL
436063	2009 RG_{70}	—	September 11, 2009	Catalina	CSS	·	880 m	MPC · JPL
436064	2009 RK_{73}	—	September 3, 2008	Kitt Peak	Spacewatch	L4	6.9 km	MPC · JPL
436065	2009 RZ_{73}	—	September 15, 2009	Kitt Peak	Spacewatch	L4	8.7 km	MPC · JPL
436066	2009 RK_{75}	—	September 15, 2009	Kitt Peak	Spacewatch	L4	7.2 km	MPC · JPL
436067	2009 SY_{8}	—	August 20, 2009	Kitt Peak	Spacewatch	·	1.1 km	MPC · JPL
436068	2009 SQ_{40}	—	September 16, 2009	Kitt Peak	Spacewatch	·	650 m	MPC · JPL
436069	2009 SH_{48}	—	September 16, 2009	Kitt Peak	Spacewatch	L4	13 km	MPC · JPL
436070	2009 SW_{49}	—	September 17, 2009	Kitt Peak	Spacewatch	PHO	910 m	MPC · JPL
436071	2009 SC_{72}	—	September 17, 2009	Mount Lemmon	Mount Lemmon Survey	·	820 m	MPC · JPL
436072	2009 SA_{98}	—	September 20, 2009	Kitt Peak	Spacewatch	L4 · ERY	8.5 km	MPC · JPL
436073	2009 ST_{100}	—	September 18, 2009	Catalina	CSS	·	860 m	MPC · JPL
436074	2009 SX_{114}	—	September 18, 2009	Kitt Peak	Spacewatch	V	640 m	MPC · JPL
436075	2009 SX_{120}	—	September 18, 2009	Kitt Peak	Spacewatch	L4	8.7 km	MPC · JPL
436076	2009 SJ_{125}	—	September 18, 2009	Kitt Peak	Spacewatch	·	1.1 km	MPC · JPL
436077	2009 SO_{126}	—	September 18, 2009	Kitt Peak	Spacewatch	·	620 m	MPC · JPL
436078	2009 SB_{133}	—	September 18, 2009	Kitt Peak	Spacewatch	·	920 m	MPC · JPL
436079	2009 SQ_{135}	—	September 18, 2009	Kitt Peak	Spacewatch	·	770 m	MPC · JPL
436080	2009 SC_{136}	—	September 18, 2009	Kitt Peak	Spacewatch	·	1.1 km	MPC · JPL
436081	2009 SE_{157}	—	September 20, 2009	Kitt Peak	Spacewatch	·	670 m	MPC · JPL
436082	2009 SU_{157}	—	September 20, 2009	Kitt Peak	Spacewatch	L4	7.6 km	MPC · JPL
436083	2009 SV_{158}	—	September 20, 2009	Kitt Peak	Spacewatch	·	1.4 km	MPC · JPL
436084	2009 SH_{177}	—	September 20, 2009	Kitt Peak	Spacewatch	L4	7.5 km	MPC · JPL
436085	2009 SB_{180}	—	September 9, 2008	Mount Lemmon	Mount Lemmon Survey	L4	7.5 km	MPC · JPL
436086	2009 SQ_{181}	—	September 21, 2009	Mount Lemmon	Mount Lemmon Survey	3:2	4.5 km	MPC · JPL
436087	2009 SL_{188}	—	September 21, 2009	Kitt Peak	Spacewatch	·	860 m	MPC · JPL
436088	2009 SY_{199}	—	August 30, 2005	Kitt Peak	Spacewatch	V	590 m	MPC · JPL
436089	2009 SX_{201}	—	April 25, 2007	Kitt Peak	Spacewatch	T_{j} (2.99) · 3:2	4.7 km	MPC · JPL
436090	2009 ST_{211}	—	September 17, 2009	Kitt Peak	Spacewatch	3:2	5.5 km	MPC · JPL
436091	2009 SX_{212}	—	September 23, 2009	Kitt Peak	Spacewatch	·	660 m	MPC · JPL
436092	2009 SQ_{214}	—	September 23, 2009	Kitt Peak	Spacewatch	NYS	1.3 km	MPC · JPL
436093	2009 SD_{215}	—	September 23, 2009	Kitt Peak	Spacewatch	·	980 m	MPC · JPL
436094	2009 SC_{229}	—	September 29, 2009	Socorro	LINEAR	AMO · critical	530 m	MPC · JPL
436095	2009 SH_{234}	—	September 25, 2009	Kitt Peak	Spacewatch	·	650 m	MPC · JPL
436096	2009 SD_{245}	—	September 21, 2009	Kitt Peak	Spacewatch	·	700 m	MPC · JPL
436097	2009 ST_{246}	—	September 17, 2009	Kitt Peak	Spacewatch	L4	9.6 km	MPC · JPL
436098	2009 SN_{251}	—	September 20, 2009	Kitt Peak	Spacewatch	·	810 m	MPC · JPL
436099	2009 SB_{253}	—	September 22, 2009	Mount Lemmon	Mount Lemmon Survey	·	1 km	MPC · JPL
436100	2009 SJ_{267}	—	September 23, 2009	Mount Lemmon	Mount Lemmon Survey	·	1.9 km	MPC · JPL

== 436101–436200 ==
back to top

Designation			Discovery			Properties		Ref
Permanent	Provisional	Named after	Date	Site	Discoverer(s)	Category	Diam.	Ref
436101	2009 SM_{268}	—	September 24, 2009	Kitt Peak	Spacewatch	L4	6.6 km	MPC · JPL
436102	2009 SC_{284}	—	September 17, 2009	Kitt Peak	Spacewatch	·	1.1 km	MPC · JPL
436103	2009 SP_{288}	—	September 17, 2009	Kitt Peak	Spacewatch	V	680 m	MPC · JPL
436104	2009 SA_{289}	—	September 15, 2009	Kitt Peak	Spacewatch	·	540 m	MPC · JPL
436105	2009 SM_{306}	—	September 17, 2009	Kitt Peak	Spacewatch	MAS	710 m	MPC · JPL
436106	2009 SV_{311}	—	August 28, 2009	Kitt Peak	Spacewatch	·	800 m	MPC · JPL
436107	2009 SR_{319}	—	September 20, 2009	Kitt Peak	Spacewatch	L4	7.2 km	MPC · JPL
436108	2009 SU_{321}	—	September 21, 2009	Kitt Peak	Spacewatch	L4	7.3 km	MPC · JPL
436109	2009 SP_{323}	—	September 23, 2009	Mount Lemmon	Mount Lemmon Survey	·	1.5 km	MPC · JPL
436110	2009 SB_{346}	—	September 22, 2009	Kitt Peak	Spacewatch	·	610 m	MPC · JPL
436111	2009 SY_{349}	—	September 16, 2009	Catalina	CSS	·	880 m	MPC · JPL
436112	2009 ST_{354}	—	September 23, 2009	Kitt Peak	Spacewatch	3:2	4.6 km	MPC · JPL
436113	2009 SV_{354}	—	September 28, 2009	Mount Lemmon	Mount Lemmon Survey	L4	10 km	MPC · JPL
436114	2009 SF_{360}	—	September 27, 2009	Catalina	CSS	·	1.1 km	MPC · JPL
436115	2009 TZ_{1}	—	October 10, 2009	La Sagra	OAM	·	1.1 km	MPC · JPL
436116	2009 TB_{3}	—	October 12, 2009	Mount Lemmon	Mount Lemmon Survey	AMO	200 m	MPC · JPL
436117	2009 TT_{11}	—	March 12, 2008	Kitt Peak	Spacewatch	(2076)	840 m	MPC · JPL
436118	2009 TU_{14}	—	October 13, 2009	La Sagra	OAM	·	740 m	MPC · JPL
436119	2009 TX_{20}	—	October 11, 2009	La Sagra	OAM	·	720 m	MPC · JPL
436120	2009 TL_{22}	—	January 27, 2003	Socorro	LINEAR	·	1.5 km	MPC · JPL
436121	2009 TV_{22}	—	October 14, 2009	La Sagra	OAM	·	930 m	MPC · JPL
436122	2009 TG_{26}	—	October 14, 2009	Purple Mountain	PMO NEO Survey Program	·	620 m	MPC · JPL
436123	2009 TH_{28}	—	October 15, 2009	Mount Lemmon	Mount Lemmon Survey	V	560 m	MPC · JPL
436124	2009 TZ_{28}	—	September 25, 2009	Kitt Peak	Spacewatch	L4 · ERY	6.8 km	MPC · JPL
436125	2009 TM_{33}	—	November 11, 2006	Kitt Peak	Spacewatch	·	640 m	MPC · JPL
436126	2009 TE_{34}	—	October 10, 2009	La Sagra	OAM	·	2.0 km	MPC · JPL
436127	2009 TW_{36}	—	October 15, 2009	La Sagra	OAM	V	700 m	MPC · JPL
436128	2009 TT_{40}	—	October 15, 2009	Catalina	CSS	PHO	1.7 km	MPC · JPL
436129	2009 UX_{4}	—	October 11, 2009	Mount Lemmon	Mount Lemmon Survey	·	1.1 km	MPC · JPL
436130	2009 UT_{8}	—	September 28, 2009	Mount Lemmon	Mount Lemmon Survey	·	940 m	MPC · JPL
436131	2009 UG_{11}	—	September 28, 2009	Mount Lemmon	Mount Lemmon Survey	L4	6.6 km	MPC · JPL
436132	2009 UG_{17}	—	October 18, 2009	Hibiscus	Teamo, N.	V	610 m	MPC · JPL
436133	2009 UL_{17}	—	October 20, 2009	Bisei SG Center	BATTeRS	·	1.3 km	MPC · JPL
436134	2009 UB_{18}	—	October 22, 2009	Sierra Stars	Stars, Sierra	·	830 m	MPC · JPL
436135	2009 US_{25}	—	September 19, 2009	Catalina	CSS	·	1.1 km	MPC · JPL
436136	2009 UC_{26}	—	October 21, 2009	Catalina	CSS	NYS · fast	870 m	MPC · JPL
436137	2009 UH_{33}	—	October 18, 2009	Mount Lemmon	Mount Lemmon Survey	·	880 m	MPC · JPL
436138	2009 UR_{36}	—	October 22, 2009	Mount Lemmon	Mount Lemmon Survey	·	1.1 km	MPC · JPL
436139	2009 UF_{37}	—	October 22, 2009	Mount Lemmon	Mount Lemmon Survey	L4	10 km	MPC · JPL
436140	2009 UU_{57}	—	October 23, 2009	Mount Lemmon	Mount Lemmon Survey	L4	10 km	MPC · JPL
436141	2009 UW_{69}	—	October 22, 2009	Mount Lemmon	Mount Lemmon Survey	·	650 m	MPC · JPL
436142	2009 UD_{76}	—	September 18, 2009	Kitt Peak	Spacewatch	L4	8.3 km	MPC · JPL
436143	2009 US_{81}	—	October 22, 2009	Mount Lemmon	Mount Lemmon Survey	L4	8.3 km	MPC · JPL
436144	2009 UF_{84}	—	September 22, 2009	Mount Lemmon	Mount Lemmon Survey	·	820 m	MPC · JPL
436145	2009 UV_{100}	—	October 23, 2009	Mount Lemmon	Mount Lemmon Survey	·	1.4 km	MPC · JPL
436146	2009 UN_{101}	—	October 23, 2009	Mount Lemmon	Mount Lemmon Survey	L4	7.0 km	MPC · JPL
436147	2009 UK_{141}	—	October 21, 2009	Catalina	CSS	·	1.6 km	MPC · JPL
436148	2009 UZ_{141}	—	August 31, 2005	Kitt Peak	Spacewatch	NYS	1.0 km	MPC · JPL
436149 Edabel	2009 VL	Edabel	November 7, 2009	Front Royal	Skillman, D. R.	·	1.2 km	MPC · JPL
436150	2009 VM_{6}	—	November 8, 2009	Mount Lemmon	Mount Lemmon Survey	·	920 m	MPC · JPL
436151	2009 VQ_{6}	—	September 29, 2008	Kitt Peak	Spacewatch	L4	7.3 km	MPC · JPL
436152	2009 VR_{8}	—	October 24, 2009	Kitt Peak	Spacewatch	·	1.2 km	MPC · JPL
436153	2009 VE_{16}	—	September 22, 2009	Mount Lemmon	Mount Lemmon Survey	·	970 m	MPC · JPL
436154	2009 VG_{18}	—	November 9, 2009	Kitt Peak	Spacewatch	(5)	1.2 km	MPC · JPL
436155	2009 VO_{18}	—	October 22, 2009	Catalina	CSS	·	1.5 km	MPC · JPL
436156	2009 VH_{26}	—	November 8, 2009	Kitt Peak	Spacewatch	3:2	4.8 km	MPC · JPL
436157	2009 VX_{27}	—	November 8, 2009	Catalina	CSS	L4	10 km	MPC · JPL
436158	2009 VZ_{28}	—	November 9, 2009	Kitt Peak	Spacewatch	·	1.2 km	MPC · JPL
436159	2009 VB_{29}	—	October 30, 2009	Mount Lemmon	Mount Lemmon Survey	·	1.2 km	MPC · JPL
436160	2009 VB_{38}	—	November 8, 2009	Mount Lemmon	Mount Lemmon Survey	·	1.1 km	MPC · JPL
436161	2009 VA_{50}	—	November 11, 2009	La Sagra	OAM	·	1.0 km	MPC · JPL
436162	2009 VG_{60}	—	November 10, 2009	Catalina	CSS	·	3.1 km	MPC · JPL
436163	2009 VO_{60}	—	November 11, 2009	Catalina	CSS	·	1.5 km	MPC · JPL
436164	2009 VJ_{61}	—	November 8, 2009	Kitt Peak	Spacewatch	·	1.3 km	MPC · JPL
436165	2009 VZ_{62}	—	November 18, 1998	Kitt Peak	Spacewatch	·	1.1 km	MPC · JPL
436166	2009 VM_{74}	—	September 21, 2009	Mount Lemmon	Mount Lemmon Survey	·	1.1 km	MPC · JPL
436167	2009 VQ_{79}	—	November 10, 2009	Catalina	CSS	·	2.5 km	MPC · JPL
436168	2009 VF_{82}	—	October 17, 2009	Mount Lemmon	Mount Lemmon Survey	·	1.6 km	MPC · JPL
436169	2009 VA_{84}	—	October 11, 1991	Kitt Peak	Spacewatch	·	1.0 km	MPC · JPL
436170	2009 VG_{95}	—	November 9, 2009	Kitt Peak	Spacewatch	MAS	800 m	MPC · JPL
436171	2009 VA_{103}	—	November 11, 2009	Kitt Peak	Spacewatch	(5)	1.2 km	MPC · JPL
436172	2009 VG_{110}	—	November 9, 2009	La Sagra	OAM	·	1.9 km	MPC · JPL
436173	2009 VH_{110}	—	September 21, 2009	Mount Lemmon	Mount Lemmon Survey	·	1.7 km	MPC · JPL
436174	2009 VY_{114}	—	November 11, 2009	Mount Lemmon	Mount Lemmon Survey	·	2.0 km	MPC · JPL
436175	2009 WR_{7}	—	November 19, 2009	Mount Lemmon	Mount Lemmon Survey	·	1.9 km	MPC · JPL
436176	2009 WA_{9}	—	November 18, 2009	Socorro	LINEAR	PHO	950 m	MPC · JPL
436177	2009 WA_{10}	—	November 17, 2009	Catalina	CSS	PHO	1.0 km	MPC · JPL
436178	2009 WJ_{18}	—	November 17, 2009	Kitt Peak	Spacewatch	·	1.5 km	MPC · JPL
436179	2009 WD_{20}	—	November 17, 2009	Mount Lemmon	Mount Lemmon Survey	·	2.5 km	MPC · JPL
436180	2009 WJ_{22}	—	November 18, 2009	Kitt Peak	Spacewatch	(5)	960 m	MPC · JPL
436181	2009 WL_{29}	—	November 16, 2009	Mount Lemmon	Mount Lemmon Survey	·	870 m	MPC · JPL
436182	2009 WK_{30}	—	November 26, 2005	Kitt Peak	Spacewatch	·	730 m	MPC · JPL
436183	2009 WH_{38}	—	November 17, 2009	Kitt Peak	Spacewatch	·	810 m	MPC · JPL
436184	2009 WH_{41}	—	November 17, 2009	Kitt Peak	Spacewatch	PHO	1.0 km	MPC · JPL
436185	2009 WW_{44}	—	November 10, 2009	Kitt Peak	Spacewatch	·	1.3 km	MPC · JPL
436186	2009 WH_{47}	—	November 9, 2009	Catalina	CSS	·	2.8 km	MPC · JPL
436187	2009 WE_{53}	—	November 18, 2009	Kitt Peak	Spacewatch	·	1.3 km	MPC · JPL
436188	2009 WH_{69}	—	November 17, 2009	Mount Lemmon	Mount Lemmon Survey	EUN	1.1 km	MPC · JPL
436189	2009 WA_{77}	—	November 18, 2009	Kitt Peak	Spacewatch	·	1.2 km	MPC · JPL
436190	2009 WB_{91}	—	November 19, 2009	Kitt Peak	Spacewatch	·	1.6 km	MPC · JPL
436191	2009 WP_{107}	—	November 17, 2009	Mount Lemmon	Mount Lemmon Survey	V	630 m	MPC · JPL
436192	2009 WL_{127}	—	November 20, 2009	Kitt Peak	Spacewatch	PHO	2.8 km	MPC · JPL
436193	2009 WD_{131}	—	November 20, 2009	Kitt Peak	Spacewatch	(5)	1.2 km	MPC · JPL
436194	2009 WK_{131}	—	November 20, 2009	Kitt Peak	Spacewatch	·	1.1 km	MPC · JPL
436195	2009 WE_{134}	—	November 22, 2009	Catalina	CSS	·	1.0 km	MPC · JPL
436196	2009 WM_{164}	—	November 21, 2009	Kitt Peak	Spacewatch	·	1.2 km	MPC · JPL
436197	2009 WL_{166}	—	November 21, 2009	Mount Lemmon	Mount Lemmon Survey	·	1.6 km	MPC · JPL
436198	2009 WH_{169}	—	November 22, 2009	Kitt Peak	Spacewatch	·	1.2 km	MPC · JPL
436199	2009 WC_{171}	—	September 18, 2009	Mount Lemmon	Mount Lemmon Survey	·	1.5 km	MPC · JPL
436200	2009 WA_{184}	—	November 23, 2009	Kitt Peak	Spacewatch	·	3.8 km	MPC · JPL

== 436201–436300 ==
back to top

Designation			Discovery			Properties		Ref
Permanent	Provisional	Named after	Date	Site	Discoverer(s)	Category	Diam.	Ref
436201	2009 WY_{187}	—	November 24, 2009	Mount Lemmon	Mount Lemmon Survey	·	840 m	MPC · JPL
436202	2009 WT_{217}	—	November 17, 2009	Kitt Peak	Spacewatch	·	920 m	MPC · JPL
436203	2009 WD_{226}	—	November 17, 2009	Mount Lemmon	Mount Lemmon Survey	L4	7.5 km	MPC · JPL
436204	2009 WY_{245}	—	November 23, 2009	Kitt Peak	Spacewatch	L4	10 km	MPC · JPL
436205	2009 WC_{248}	—	September 19, 2009	Mount Lemmon	Mount Lemmon Survey	·	860 m	MPC · JPL
436206	2009 WD_{248}	—	November 17, 2009	Kitt Peak	Spacewatch	·	1.8 km	MPC · JPL
436207	2009 WK_{249}	—	November 21, 2009	Kitt Peak	Spacewatch	·	1.5 km	MPC · JPL
436208	2009 XZ_{12}	—	December 11, 2009	Mount Lemmon	Mount Lemmon Survey	AGN	1.1 km	MPC · JPL
436209	2009 XO_{17}	—	December 15, 2009	Mount Lemmon	Mount Lemmon Survey	·	1.7 km	MPC · JPL
436210	2009 XV_{17}	—	December 15, 2009	Mount Lemmon	Mount Lemmon Survey	·	2.2 km	MPC · JPL
436211	2009 XA_{18}	—	December 15, 2009	Mount Lemmon	Mount Lemmon Survey	·	2.6 km	MPC · JPL
436212	2009 XG_{19}	—	December 15, 2009	Mount Lemmon	Mount Lemmon Survey	·	1.8 km	MPC · JPL
436213	2009 XP_{19}	—	December 15, 2009	Mount Lemmon	Mount Lemmon Survey	·	1.2 km	MPC · JPL
436214	2009 XR_{22}	—	December 13, 2009	Haleakala	M. Micheli	·	890 m	MPC · JPL
436215	2009 XB_{23}	—	December 15, 2009	Mount Lemmon	Mount Lemmon Survey	·	1.4 km	MPC · JPL
436216	2009 YD	—	December 16, 2009	Tiki	Teamo, N.	(5)	1.3 km	MPC · JPL
436217	2009 YA_{8}	—	December 16, 2009	Mount Lemmon	Mount Lemmon Survey	·	1.6 km	MPC · JPL
436218	2009 YY_{22}	—	November 17, 2009	Mount Lemmon	Mount Lemmon Survey	·	2.0 km	MPC · JPL
436219	2009 YZ_{22}	—	November 16, 2009	Mount Lemmon	Mount Lemmon Survey	·	1.5 km	MPC · JPL
436220	2010 AA_{11}	—	January 6, 2010	Mount Lemmon	Mount Lemmon Survey	·	910 m	MPC · JPL
436221	2010 AZ_{11}	—	January 6, 2010	Catalina	CSS	·	1.5 km	MPC · JPL
436222	2010 AV_{16}	—	January 7, 2010	Mount Lemmon	Mount Lemmon Survey	·	2.2 km	MPC · JPL
436223	2010 AZ_{24}	—	November 21, 2009	Mount Lemmon	Mount Lemmon Survey	·	1.9 km	MPC · JPL
436224	2010 AJ_{26}	—	January 6, 2010	Kitt Peak	Spacewatch	·	1.3 km	MPC · JPL
436225	2010 AV_{31}	—	January 6, 2010	Kitt Peak	Spacewatch	·	2.3 km	MPC · JPL
436226	2010 AR_{32}	—	January 7, 2010	Kitt Peak	Spacewatch	PAD	1.8 km	MPC · JPL
436227	2010 AV_{40}	—	November 21, 2009	Mount Lemmon	Mount Lemmon Survey	·	1.4 km	MPC · JPL
436228	2010 AE_{41}	—	January 6, 2010	Kitt Peak	Spacewatch	·	1.1 km	MPC · JPL
436229	2010 AF_{52}	—	March 9, 2003	Kitt Peak	Spacewatch	·	1.6 km	MPC · JPL
436230	2010 AE_{54}	—	December 19, 2004	Mount Lemmon	Mount Lemmon Survey	·	1.6 km	MPC · JPL
436231	2010 AX_{55}	—	January 8, 2010	Kitt Peak	Spacewatch	·	2.4 km	MPC · JPL
436232	2010 AY_{61}	—	December 26, 2009	Kitt Peak	Spacewatch	·	1.9 km	MPC · JPL
436233	2010 AV_{63}	—	January 8, 2010	Kitt Peak	Spacewatch	DOR	2.6 km	MPC · JPL
436234	2010 AQ_{66}	—	November 20, 2009	Kitt Peak	Spacewatch	·	2.8 km	MPC · JPL
436235	2010 AB_{67}	—	January 11, 2010	Kitt Peak	Spacewatch	·	2.6 km	MPC · JPL
436236	2010 AW_{68}	—	January 6, 2010	Catalina	CSS	·	1.9 km	MPC · JPL
436237	2010 AA_{74}	—	January 23, 2006	Kitt Peak	Spacewatch	(5)	1.4 km	MPC · JPL
436238	2010 AW_{74}	—	October 27, 2005	Mount Lemmon	Mount Lemmon Survey	RAF	1.0 km	MPC · JPL
436239	2010 AB_{80}	—	January 11, 2010	Kitt Peak	Spacewatch	·	1.6 km	MPC · JPL
436240	2010 AY_{80}	—	October 18, 2009	Mount Lemmon	Mount Lemmon Survey	·	1.1 km	MPC · JPL
436241	2010 AM_{89}	—	January 8, 2010	WISE	WISE	L4	12 km	MPC · JPL
436242	2010 AH_{90}	—	March 16, 2010	Catalina	CSS	·	3.3 km	MPC · JPL
436243	2010 AJ_{93}	—	October 27, 2008	Mount Lemmon	Mount Lemmon Survey	DOR	2.7 km	MPC · JPL
436244	2010 BO_{4}	—	January 23, 2010	Bisei SG Center	BATTeRS	·	2.0 km	MPC · JPL
436245	2010 BE_{6}	—	January 24, 2010	Siding Spring	SSS	·	3.2 km	MPC · JPL
436246	2010 BK_{51}	—	October 12, 2007	Catalina	CSS	·	4.2 km	MPC · JPL
436247	2010 BX_{54}	—	November 17, 2009	Mount Lemmon	Mount Lemmon Survey	L4	11 km	MPC · JPL
436248	2010 BW_{65}	—	January 21, 2010	WISE	WISE	·	4.4 km	MPC · JPL
436249	2010 BM_{74}	—	September 13, 2007	Mount Lemmon	Mount Lemmon Survey	·	3.4 km	MPC · JPL
436250	2010 BR_{75}	—	January 24, 2010	WISE	WISE	·	2.4 km	MPC · JPL
436251	2010 BC_{84}	—	January 17, 2009	Mount Lemmon	Mount Lemmon Survey	·	2.9 km	MPC · JPL
436252	2010 BR_{86}	—	December 1, 2008	Mount Lemmon	Mount Lemmon Survey	·	4.0 km	MPC · JPL
436253	2010 BE_{90}	—	January 26, 2010	WISE	WISE	·	3.7 km	MPC · JPL
436254	2010 BY_{94}	—	July 30, 2006	Siding Spring	SSS	·	4.8 km	MPC · JPL
436255	2010 BV_{105}	—	November 10, 2009	Mount Lemmon	Mount Lemmon Survey	L4	10 km	MPC · JPL
436256	2010 CK_{2}	—	January 11, 2010	Kitt Peak	Spacewatch	·	1.8 km	MPC · JPL
436257	2010 CM_{2}	—	February 5, 2010	Kitt Peak	Spacewatch	·	1.3 km	MPC · JPL
436258	2010 CQ_{2}	—	February 5, 2010	Kitt Peak	Spacewatch	·	2.0 km	MPC · JPL
436259	2010 CH_{4}	—	February 6, 2010	Mount Lemmon	Mount Lemmon Survey	·	1.8 km	MPC · JPL
436260	2010 CM_{7}	—	February 6, 2010	WISE	WISE	·	4.2 km	MPC · JPL
436261	2010 CF_{8}	—	February 7, 2010	WISE	WISE	·	4.0 km	MPC · JPL
436262	2010 CB_{11}	—	February 9, 2010	WISE	WISE	DOR	2.7 km	MPC · JPL
436263	2010 CW_{20}	—	February 9, 2010	Kitt Peak	Spacewatch	AGN	2.5 km	MPC · JPL
436264	2010 CO_{24}	—	February 9, 2010	Mount Lemmon	Mount Lemmon Survey	·	2.1 km	MPC · JPL
436265	2010 CZ_{38}	—	September 11, 2007	Mount Lemmon	Mount Lemmon Survey	·	1.6 km	MPC · JPL
436266	2010 CO_{63}	—	February 9, 2010	Kitt Peak	Spacewatch	·	1.8 km	MPC · JPL
436267	2010 CU_{80}	—	February 13, 2010	Mount Lemmon	Mount Lemmon Survey	·	1.8 km	MPC · JPL
436268	2010 CW_{80}	—	February 13, 2010	Mount Lemmon	Mount Lemmon Survey	·	2.6 km	MPC · JPL
436269	2010 CF_{83}	—	January 7, 2010	Kitt Peak	Spacewatch	EUN	1.3 km	MPC · JPL
436270	2010 CX_{92}	—	September 16, 2003	Kitt Peak	Spacewatch	·	1.9 km	MPC · JPL
436271	2010 CJ_{93}	—	February 14, 2010	Kitt Peak	Spacewatch	AEO	1.0 km	MPC · JPL
436272	2010 CJ_{111}	—	February 14, 2010	Mount Lemmon	Mount Lemmon Survey	ADE	2.0 km	MPC · JPL
436273	2010 CC_{141}	—	February 19, 2010	Socorro	LINEAR	·	2.0 km	MPC · JPL
436274	2010 CF_{141}	—	February 27, 2006	Kitt Peak	Spacewatch	·	1.1 km	MPC · JPL
436275	2010 CT_{141}	—	September 27, 2003	Kitt Peak	Spacewatch	·	2.5 km	MPC · JPL
436276	2010 CJ_{144}	—	January 15, 2010	Catalina	CSS	·	2.6 km	MPC · JPL
436277	2010 CD_{145}	—	February 13, 2010	Catalina	CSS	·	3.1 km	MPC · JPL
436278	2010 CW_{163}	—	October 22, 2008	Mount Lemmon	Mount Lemmon Survey	·	2.0 km	MPC · JPL
436279	2010 CG_{170}	—	February 10, 2010	Kitt Peak	Spacewatch	·	2.0 km	MPC · JPL
436280	2010 CS_{171}	—	November 2, 2008	Mount Lemmon	Mount Lemmon Survey	·	1.8 km	MPC · JPL
436281	2010 CH_{181}	—	February 14, 2010	Haleakala	Pan-STARRS 1	·	2.0 km	MPC · JPL
436282	2010 CR_{184}	—	September 17, 2004	Kitt Peak	Spacewatch	·	1.5 km	MPC · JPL
436283	2010 CF_{185}	—	February 13, 2010	Socorro	LINEAR	GEF	3.7 km	MPC · JPL
436284	2010 CW_{185}	—	November 13, 2007	Kitt Peak	Spacewatch	·	4.1 km	MPC · JPL
436285	2010 CA_{214}	—	February 6, 2010	WISE	WISE	·	4.8 km	MPC · JPL
436286	2010 CK_{221}	—	August 21, 2006	Kitt Peak	Spacewatch	EOS	4.3 km	MPC · JPL
436287	2010 CZ_{227}	—	February 9, 2010	WISE	WISE	·	3.5 km	MPC · JPL
436288	2010 CW_{230}	—	February 10, 2010	WISE	WISE	·	3.3 km	MPC · JPL
436289	2010 DV_{12}	—	February 16, 2010	WISE	WISE	·	3.7 km	MPC · JPL
436290	2010 DV_{30}	—	February 20, 2010	WISE	WISE	·	3.3 km	MPC · JPL
436291	2010 DL_{31}	—	February 20, 2010	WISE	WISE	·	4.0 km	MPC · JPL
436292	2010 DO_{40}	—	February 16, 2010	Mount Lemmon	Mount Lemmon Survey	KON	3.0 km	MPC · JPL
436293	2010 DT_{45}	—	February 17, 2010	Kitt Peak	Spacewatch	·	2.2 km	MPC · JPL
436294	2010 DP_{46}	—	February 17, 2010	Kitt Peak	Spacewatch	·	1.7 km	MPC · JPL
436295	2010 DT_{47}	—	February 17, 2010	Kitt Peak	Spacewatch	·	1.8 km	MPC · JPL
436296	2010 DQ_{48}	—	February 17, 2010	Mount Lemmon	Mount Lemmon Survey	·	1.8 km	MPC · JPL
436297	2010 DX_{52}	—	February 22, 2010	WISE	WISE	·	4.2 km	MPC · JPL
436298	2010 DG_{61}	—	February 25, 2010	WISE	WISE	·	2.7 km	MPC · JPL
436299	2010 EF_{5}	—	March 2, 2010	WISE	WISE	·	4.3 km	MPC · JPL
436300	2010 EA_{11}	—	March 2, 2010	WISE	WISE	·	4.0 km	MPC · JPL

== 436301–436400 ==
back to top

Designation			Discovery			Properties		Ref
Permanent	Provisional	Named after	Date	Site	Discoverer(s)	Category	Diam.	Ref
436301	2010 EP_{11}	—	March 3, 2010	WISE	WISE	·	5.0 km	MPC · JPL
436302	2010 EE_{22}	—	September 12, 2007	Mount Lemmon	Mount Lemmon Survey	·	2.1 km	MPC · JPL
436303	2010 EV_{33}	—	February 16, 2010	Mount Lemmon	Mount Lemmon Survey	EOS	2.1 km	MPC · JPL
436304	2010 EJ_{38}	—	March 12, 2010	Kitt Peak	Spacewatch	·	2.3 km	MPC · JPL
436305	2010 EN_{68}	—	March 12, 2010	Mount Lemmon	Mount Lemmon Survey	·	1.8 km	MPC · JPL
436306	2010 EQ_{68}	—	March 12, 2010	Mount Lemmon	Mount Lemmon Survey	·	2.9 km	MPC · JPL
436307	2010 EO_{69}	—	March 13, 2010	Catalina	CSS	·	2.8 km	MPC · JPL
436308	2010 EB_{89}	—	March 14, 2010	Mount Lemmon	Mount Lemmon Survey	·	1.6 km	MPC · JPL
436309	2010 EL_{96}	—	February 18, 2010	Mount Lemmon	Mount Lemmon Survey	·	1.9 km	MPC · JPL
436310	2010 EZ_{99}	—	March 14, 2010	Kitt Peak	Spacewatch	·	3.0 km	MPC · JPL
436311	2010 EY_{124}	—	March 12, 2010	Catalina	CSS	DOR	3.1 km	MPC · JPL
436312	2010 EN_{133}	—	March 14, 2010	Kitt Peak	Spacewatch	·	2.4 km	MPC · JPL
436313	2010 FQ_{14}	—	November 23, 2003	Kitt Peak	Spacewatch	·	1.9 km	MPC · JPL
436314	2010 FW_{16}	—	March 12, 2010	Kitt Peak	Spacewatch	·	2.4 km	MPC · JPL
436315	2010 FW_{22}	—	March 18, 2010	Mount Lemmon	Mount Lemmon Survey	·	2.7 km	MPC · JPL
436316	2010 FG_{28}	—	March 20, 2010	Mount Lemmon	Mount Lemmon Survey	·	4.0 km	MPC · JPL
436317	2010 FP_{47}	—	March 22, 2010	ESA OGS	ESA OGS	·	1.7 km	MPC · JPL
436318	2010 FQ_{57}	—	March 20, 2010	Catalina	CSS	·	1.8 km	MPC · JPL
436319	2010 FT_{61}	—	December 20, 2009	Catalina	CSS	·	1.4 km	MPC · JPL
436320	2010 FB_{84}	—	March 25, 2010	Kitt Peak	Spacewatch	·	2.6 km	MPC · JPL
436321	2010 FB_{88}	—	March 20, 2010	Catalina	CSS	·	2.8 km	MPC · JPL
436322	2010 FU_{96}	—	September 12, 2007	Mount Lemmon	Mount Lemmon Survey	·	1.6 km	MPC · JPL
436323	2010 FS_{100}	—	September 13, 2007	Mount Lemmon	Mount Lemmon Survey	AST	1.5 km	MPC · JPL
436324	2010 GZ_{6}	—	April 6, 2010	Catalina	CSS	AMO	370 m	MPC · JPL
436325	2010 GR_{7}	—	April 6, 2010	Socorro	LINEAR	APO	450 m	MPC · JPL
436326	2010 GP_{32}	—	April 8, 2010	Sandlot	G. Hug	·	1.8 km	MPC · JPL
436327	2010 GV_{32}	—	April 5, 2010	Mount Lemmon	Mount Lemmon Survey	·	2.5 km	MPC · JPL
436328	2010 GV_{58}	—	April 10, 2010	WISE	WISE	·	2.8 km	MPC · JPL
436329	2010 GX_{62}	—	April 10, 2010	WISE	WISE	T_{j} (2.76) · APO · PHA · critical	620 m	MPC · JPL
436330	2010 GQ_{102}	—	March 13, 2010	Kitt Peak	Spacewatch	GEF	1.0 km	MPC · JPL
436331	2010 GF_{112}	—	March 16, 2010	Kitt Peak	Spacewatch	·	2.2 km	MPC · JPL
436332	2010 GQ_{127}	—	May 8, 1994	Kitt Peak	Spacewatch	·	2.8 km	MPC · JPL
436333	2010 GD_{145}	—	April 12, 2010	WISE	WISE	·	3.1 km	MPC · JPL
436334	2010 GH_{159}	—	April 7, 2010	Catalina	CSS	·	2.5 km	MPC · JPL
436335	2010 GB_{172}	—	January 1, 2009	Mount Lemmon	Mount Lemmon Survey	·	2.5 km	MPC · JPL
436336	2010 HA_{14}	—	April 18, 2010	WISE	WISE	·	3.7 km	MPC · JPL
436337	2010 HR_{23}	—	April 25, 2010	Mount Lemmon	Mount Lemmon Survey	·	3.4 km	MPC · JPL
436338	2010 HM_{40}	—	April 22, 2010	WISE	WISE	·	4.7 km	MPC · JPL
436339	2010 HY_{42}	—	April 22, 2010	WISE	WISE	·	1.8 km	MPC · JPL
436340	2010 HX_{103}	—	January 30, 2009	Kitt Peak	Spacewatch	·	1.9 km	MPC · JPL
436341	2010 HW_{104}	—	April 25, 2010	Mount Lemmon	Mount Lemmon Survey	H	590 m	MPC · JPL
436342	2010 HF_{108}	—	April 25, 2010	Kitt Peak	Spacewatch	·	2.5 km	MPC · JPL
436343	2010 JL_{3}	—	May 5, 2010	Nogales	Tenagra II	·	4.5 km	MPC · JPL
436344	2010 JP_{14}	—	October 9, 2008	Catalina	CSS	·	4.1 km	MPC · JPL
436345	2010 JZ_{18}	—	May 3, 2010	WISE	WISE	·	4.1 km	MPC · JPL
436346	2010 JC_{32}	—	May 6, 2010	Mount Lemmon	Mount Lemmon Survey	·	3.9 km	MPC · JPL
436347	2010 JP_{39}	—	April 20, 2010	Mount Lemmon	Mount Lemmon Survey	H	490 m	MPC · JPL
436348	2010 JS_{73}	—	August 28, 2006	Kitt Peak	Spacewatch	·	3.0 km	MPC · JPL
436349	2010 JK_{77}	—	May 12, 2010	Nogales	M. Schwartz, P. R. Holvorcem	·	3.2 km	MPC · JPL
436350	2010 JU_{77}	—	May 7, 2010	Kitt Peak	Spacewatch	·	3.2 km	MPC · JPL
436351	2010 JL_{79}	—	April 9, 2010	Mount Lemmon	Mount Lemmon Survey	·	3.2 km	MPC · JPL
436352	2010 JV_{82}	—	May 3, 2010	Nogales	Tenagra II	·	3.2 km	MPC · JPL
436353	2010 JC_{112}	—	May 12, 2010	Kitt Peak	Spacewatch	·	2.3 km	MPC · JPL
436354	2010 JN_{116}	—	May 11, 2010	Mount Lemmon	Mount Lemmon Survey	·	2.3 km	MPC · JPL
436355	2010 JS_{117}	—	May 7, 2010	Kitt Peak	Spacewatch	HYG	3.4 km	MPC · JPL
436356	2010 JX_{130}	—	May 13, 2010	WISE	WISE	·	3.8 km	MPC · JPL
436357	2010 JO_{151}	—	May 3, 2010	Kitt Peak	Spacewatch	TIR	2.9 km	MPC · JPL
436358	2010 JR_{175}	—	May 13, 2010	Kitt Peak	Spacewatch	·	3.5 km	MPC · JPL
436359	2010 KE_{2}	—	May 16, 2010	WISE	WISE	·	4.1 km	MPC · JPL
436360	2010 KS_{19}	—	May 17, 2010	WISE	WISE	·	3.5 km	MPC · JPL
436361	2010 KA_{31}	—	May 19, 2010	WISE	WISE	THB	3.5 km	MPC · JPL
436362	2010 KW_{32}	—	February 2, 2008	Kitt Peak	Spacewatch	·	5.0 km	MPC · JPL
436363	2010 KT_{37}	—	November 18, 2007	Kitt Peak	Spacewatch	·	1.5 km	MPC · JPL
436364	2010 KB_{39}	—	November 9, 2007	Kitt Peak	Spacewatch	·	2.1 km	MPC · JPL
436365	2010 KG_{125}	—	May 31, 2010	WISE	WISE	THB	3.7 km	MPC · JPL
436366	2010 LA_{35}	—	June 7, 2010	Kitt Peak	Spacewatch	EOS	2.3 km	MPC · JPL
436367	2010 LP_{35}	—	June 7, 2010	Kitt Peak	Spacewatch	·	2.7 km	MPC · JPL
436368	2010 LS_{55}	—	June 9, 2010	WISE	WISE	·	2.9 km	MPC · JPL
436369	2010 LV_{69}	—	June 9, 2010	WISE	WISE	T_{j} (2.98)	4.7 km	MPC · JPL
436370	2010 ME_{115}	—	June 30, 2010	WISE	WISE	3:2 · SHU	7.1 km	MPC · JPL
436371	2010 NJ_{3}	—	July 15, 2010	Andrushivka	Andrushivka	·	4.1 km	MPC · JPL
436372	2010 NU_{32}	—	December 4, 2005	Catalina	CSS	·	6.2 km	MPC · JPL
436373	2010 OT_{41}	—	September 28, 2000	Socorro	LINEAR	·	4.6 km	MPC · JPL
436374	2010 OY_{60}	—	July 23, 2010	WISE	WISE	·	4.5 km	MPC · JPL
436375	2010 OA_{77}	—	July 25, 2010	WISE	WISE	·	4.0 km	MPC · JPL
436376	2010 OG_{101}	—	July 17, 2010	La Sagra	OAM	·	3.3 km	MPC · JPL
436377	2010 OF_{106}	—	July 29, 2010	WISE	WISE	·	2.9 km	MPC · JPL
436378	2010 OH_{109}	—	January 29, 2009	Mount Lemmon	Mount Lemmon Survey	·	4.4 km	MPC · JPL
436379	2010 OT_{117}	—	July 30, 2010	WISE	WISE	·	3.9 km	MPC · JPL
436380	2010 PB_{70}	—	August 9, 2010	WISE	WISE	3:2	5.8 km	MPC · JPL
436381	2010 RP_{74}	—	September 11, 2010	Mount Lemmon	Mount Lemmon Survey	L4	8.1 km	MPC · JPL
436382	2010 RQ_{74}	—	September 11, 2010	Mount Lemmon	Mount Lemmon Survey	L4	9.8 km	MPC · JPL
436383	2010 RC_{104}	—	September 10, 2010	Kitt Peak	Spacewatch	·	630 m	MPC · JPL
436384	2010 TD_{19}	—	October 6, 2010	Siding Spring	SSS	·	1.6 km	MPC · JPL
436385	2010 TK_{47}	—	October 1, 2010	Mount Lemmon	Mount Lemmon Survey	·	510 m	MPC · JPL
436386	2010 TB_{153}	—	November 2, 2007	Kitt Peak	Spacewatch	·	480 m	MPC · JPL
436387	2010 VB_{20}	—	November 2, 2010	Mount Lemmon	Mount Lemmon Survey	·	790 m	MPC · JPL
436388	2010 VP_{48}	—	February 15, 2010	Mount Lemmon	Mount Lemmon Survey	L4	10 km	MPC · JPL
436389	2010 VR_{72}	—	November 2, 2010	Mount Lemmon	Mount Lemmon Survey	·	660 m	MPC · JPL
436390	2010 VW_{79}	—	October 4, 2002	Campo Imperatore	CINEOS	3:2 · (6124)	6.2 km	MPC · JPL
436391	2010 VN_{111}	—	October 17, 2010	Mount Lemmon	Mount Lemmon Survey	L4	7.1 km	MPC · JPL
436392	2010 VE_{114}	—	October 13, 2010	Mount Lemmon	Mount Lemmon Survey	·	670 m	MPC · JPL
436393	2010 VA_{149}	—	November 6, 2010	Mount Lemmon	Mount Lemmon Survey	L4	8.9 km	MPC · JPL
436394	2010 VF_{172}	—	September 27, 2009	Kitt Peak	Spacewatch	L4	7.6 km	MPC · JPL
436395	2010 VJ_{176}	—	October 13, 2010	Mount Lemmon	Mount Lemmon Survey	·	830 m	MPC · JPL
436396	2010 VD_{179}	—	November 11, 2010	Mount Lemmon	Mount Lemmon Survey	L4	9.3 km	MPC · JPL
436397	2010 VA_{186}	—	September 28, 2009	Mount Lemmon	Mount Lemmon Survey	L4	8.2 km	MPC · JPL
436398	2010 VA_{203}	—	October 14, 2010	Mount Lemmon	Mount Lemmon Survey	L4	8.4 km	MPC · JPL
436399	2010 VX_{206}	—	September 30, 2010	Mount Lemmon	Mount Lemmon Survey	3:2	5.2 km	MPC · JPL
436400	2010 WB_{8}	—	September 11, 2004	Socorro	LINEAR	·	3.8 km	MPC · JPL

== 436401–436500 ==
back to top

Designation			Discovery			Properties		Ref
Permanent	Provisional	Named after	Date	Site	Discoverer(s)	Category	Diam.	Ref
436401	2010 WD_{13}	—	October 22, 2009	Mount Lemmon	Mount Lemmon Survey	L4	8.1 km	MPC · JPL
436402	2010 WM_{62}	—	January 1, 2008	Mount Lemmon	Mount Lemmon Survey	·	590 m	MPC · JPL
436403	2010 WS_{66}	—	October 29, 2010	Kitt Peak	Spacewatch	L4	8.6 km	MPC · JPL
436404	2010 XE_{18}	—	November 7, 2010	Mount Lemmon	Mount Lemmon Survey	·	880 m	MPC · JPL
436405	2010 XE_{31}	—	September 21, 2009	Kitt Peak	Spacewatch	L4	7.0 km	MPC · JPL
436406	2010 XL_{38}	—	November 5, 2010	Mount Lemmon	Mount Lemmon Survey	·	730 m	MPC · JPL
436407	2010 XO_{40}	—	February 3, 2008	Mount Lemmon	Mount Lemmon Survey	·	700 m	MPC · JPL
436408	2010 XW_{41}	—	October 4, 2006	Mount Lemmon	Mount Lemmon Survey	·	1.1 km	MPC · JPL
436409	2010 XW_{81}	—	November 10, 2010	Mount Lemmon	Mount Lemmon Survey	L4	8.0 km	MPC · JPL
436410	2011 AH_{10}	—	December 14, 2010	Mount Lemmon	Mount Lemmon Survey	·	980 m	MPC · JPL
436411	2011 AW_{13}	—	November 3, 2010	Mount Lemmon	Mount Lemmon Survey	·	960 m	MPC · JPL
436412	2011 AO_{20}	—	April 4, 2008	Kitt Peak	Spacewatch	·	790 m	MPC · JPL
436413	2011 AG_{23}	—	February 10, 2008	Mount Lemmon	Mount Lemmon Survey	·	650 m	MPC · JPL
436414	2011 AR_{44}	—	May 14, 2008	Mount Lemmon	Mount Lemmon Survey	MAS	560 m	MPC · JPL
436415	2011 AW_{46}	—	January 10, 2011	Kitt Peak	Spacewatch	·	640 m	MPC · JPL
436416	2011 AE_{59}	—	January 12, 2011	Mount Lemmon	Mount Lemmon Survey	·	740 m	MPC · JPL
436417	2011 AK_{60}	—	September 28, 2006	Kitt Peak	Spacewatch	·	720 m	MPC · JPL
436418	2011 AM_{60}	—	August 9, 2005	Cerro Tololo	Deep Ecliptic Survey	·	780 m	MPC · JPL
436419	2011 AG_{62}	—	January 13, 2011	Mount Lemmon	Mount Lemmon Survey	·	680 m	MPC · JPL
436420	2011 AE_{64}	—	February 1, 1995	Kitt Peak	Spacewatch	·	740 m	MPC · JPL
436421	2011 AU_{64}	—	September 17, 2006	Kitt Peak	Spacewatch	·	750 m	MPC · JPL
436422	2011 AX_{65}	—	May 27, 2008	Kitt Peak	Spacewatch	NYS	760 m	MPC · JPL
436423	2011 BV_{1}	—	March 1, 2008	Kitt Peak	Spacewatch	·	660 m	MPC · JPL
436424	2011 BD_{10}	—	March 29, 2008	Kitt Peak	Spacewatch	·	730 m	MPC · JPL
436425	2011 BT_{11}	—	November 15, 2010	Mount Lemmon	Mount Lemmon Survey	·	1.0 km	MPC · JPL
436426	2011 BF_{12}	—	November 5, 2010	Mount Lemmon	Mount Lemmon Survey	·	830 m	MPC · JPL
436427	2011 BE_{17}	—	March 17, 2004	Kitt Peak	Spacewatch	NYS	680 m	MPC · JPL
436428	2011 BY_{25}	—	August 30, 2006	Anderson Mesa	LONEOS	·	840 m	MPC · JPL
436429	2011 BS_{27}	—	March 18, 2004	Socorro	LINEAR	(2076)	880 m	MPC · JPL
436430	2011 BA_{28}	—	January 2, 2011	Mount Lemmon	Mount Lemmon Survey	·	1.4 km	MPC · JPL
436431	2011 BW_{47}	—	September 18, 2009	Kitt Peak	Spacewatch	·	880 m	MPC · JPL
436432	2011 BD_{52}	—	March 15, 2004	Catalina	CSS	·	1.3 km	MPC · JPL
436433	2011 BK_{52}	—	April 8, 1997	Kitt Peak	Spacewatch	·	880 m	MPC · JPL
436434	2011 BX_{53}	—	January 30, 2011	Mount Lemmon	Mount Lemmon Survey	·	830 m	MPC · JPL
436435	2011 BP_{87}	—	April 15, 2004	Catalina	CSS	·	980 m	MPC · JPL
436436	2011 BS_{88}	—	June 14, 2005	Kitt Peak	Spacewatch	·	940 m	MPC · JPL
436437	2011 BV_{97}	—	April 30, 2004	Kitt Peak	Spacewatch	·	1.0 km	MPC · JPL
436438	2011 BU_{161}	—	February 11, 2004	Kitt Peak	Spacewatch	·	670 m	MPC · JPL
436439	2011 CR_{3}	—	February 12, 2004	Kitt Peak	Spacewatch	·	840 m	MPC · JPL
436440	2011 CA_{8}	—	November 21, 2006	Mount Lemmon	Mount Lemmon Survey	·	790 m	MPC · JPL
436441	2011 CD_{25}	—	November 16, 2006	Kitt Peak	Spacewatch	·	730 m	MPC · JPL
436442	2011 CR_{25}	—	January 24, 2011	Mount Lemmon	Mount Lemmon Survey	·	1.2 km	MPC · JPL
436443	2011 CR_{27}	—	January 13, 2011	Kitt Peak	Spacewatch	MAS	660 m	MPC · JPL
436444	2011 CJ_{44}	—	April 26, 2008	Kitt Peak	Spacewatch	V	480 m	MPC · JPL
436445	2011 CG_{48}	—	February 22, 2004	Kitt Peak	Spacewatch	·	770 m	MPC · JPL
436446	2011 CC_{49}	—	January 13, 2011	Kitt Peak	Spacewatch	·	920 m	MPC · JPL
436447	2011 CE_{54}	—	March 17, 2004	Kitt Peak	Spacewatch	MAS	550 m	MPC · JPL
436448	2011 CZ_{67}	—	February 16, 2004	Kitt Peak	Spacewatch	·	880 m	MPC · JPL
436449	2011 CW_{69}	—	March 25, 2000	Kitt Peak	Spacewatch	·	1.3 km	MPC · JPL
436450	2011 CQ_{72}	—	March 29, 2008	Kitt Peak	Spacewatch	·	790 m	MPC · JPL
436451	2011 CT_{74}	—	March 16, 2007	Kitt Peak	Spacewatch	·	1.2 km	MPC · JPL
436452	2011 CE_{79}	—	December 11, 2010	Mount Lemmon	Mount Lemmon Survey	·	1.7 km	MPC · JPL
436453	2011 CD_{80}	—	January 7, 2000	Kitt Peak	Spacewatch	·	1.1 km	MPC · JPL
436454	2011 CQ_{80}	—	December 13, 2006	Kitt Peak	Spacewatch	·	1.2 km	MPC · JPL
436455	2011 CN_{86}	—	January 24, 2011	Mount Lemmon	Mount Lemmon Survey	·	1.0 km	MPC · JPL
436456	2011 CY_{88}	—	October 19, 2006	Catalina	CSS	·	860 m	MPC · JPL
436457	2011 CZ_{88}	—	December 14, 2006	Kitt Peak	Spacewatch	·	1.0 km	MPC · JPL
436458	2011 CE_{89}	—	January 26, 2000	Kitt Peak	Spacewatch	·	1.1 km	MPC · JPL
436459	2011 CL_{97}	—	November 22, 2006	Mount Lemmon	Mount Lemmon Survey	V	460 m	MPC · JPL
436460	2011 CT_{113}	—	November 27, 2006	Kitt Peak	Spacewatch	·	660 m	MPC · JPL
436461	2011 DQ_{1}	—	February 22, 2011	Kitt Peak	Spacewatch	NYS	1.2 km	MPC · JPL
436462	2011 DZ_{1}	—	April 16, 2004	Kitt Peak	Spacewatch	·	860 m	MPC · JPL
436463	2011 DV_{7}	—	February 22, 2011	Kitt Peak	Spacewatch	·	1.2 km	MPC · JPL
436464	2011 DG_{11}	—	August 18, 2009	Kitt Peak	Spacewatch	·	860 m	MPC · JPL
436465	2011 DQ_{13}	—	August 28, 2005	Kitt Peak	Spacewatch	·	690 m	MPC · JPL
436466	2011 DZ_{14}	—	January 10, 2007	Mount Lemmon	Mount Lemmon Survey	·	850 m	MPC · JPL
436467	2011 DC_{17}	—	November 22, 2006	Kitt Peak	Spacewatch	·	750 m	MPC · JPL
436468	2011 DK_{18}	—	February 26, 2011	Kitt Peak	Spacewatch	MAS	660 m	MPC · JPL
436469	2011 DN_{25}	—	April 12, 2004	Anderson Mesa	LONEOS	·	980 m	MPC · JPL
436470	2011 DO_{28}	—	August 27, 2006	Kitt Peak	Spacewatch	·	570 m	MPC · JPL
436471	2011 DT_{28}	—	August 20, 2009	Kitt Peak	Spacewatch	·	690 m	MPC · JPL
436472	2011 DD_{29}	—	March 3, 2000	Socorro	LINEAR	·	950 m	MPC · JPL
436473	2011 DD_{42}	—	April 21, 2004	Campo Imperatore	CINEOS	MAS	620 m	MPC · JPL
436474	2011 DB_{49}	—	February 10, 2011	Catalina	CSS	·	1.3 km	MPC · JPL
436475	2011 EB_{4}	—	October 4, 2005	Mount Lemmon	Mount Lemmon Survey	·	1 km	MPC · JPL
436476	2011 EV_{7}	—	April 13, 2004	Kitt Peak	Spacewatch	MAS	590 m	MPC · JPL
436477	2011 EX_{7}	—	January 10, 2007	Mount Lemmon	Mount Lemmon Survey	MAS	660 m	MPC · JPL
436478	2011 EC_{9}	—	March 18, 2004	Socorro	LINEAR	·	1.1 km	MPC · JPL
436479	2011 EX_{12}	—	March 2, 2011	Kitt Peak	Spacewatch	·	1.1 km	MPC · JPL
436480	2011 EY_{13}	—	February 22, 2011	Kitt Peak	Spacewatch	NYS	910 m	MPC · JPL
436481	2011 EZ_{14}	—	January 29, 2011	Kitt Peak	Spacewatch	·	1.1 km	MPC · JPL
436482	2011 EK_{22}	—	January 8, 2011	Mount Lemmon	Mount Lemmon Survey	·	1.1 km	MPC · JPL
436483	2011 EO_{22}	—	January 8, 2011	Mount Lemmon	Mount Lemmon Survey	·	1.3 km	MPC · JPL
436484	2011 ES_{22}	—	December 5, 2010	Mount Lemmon	Mount Lemmon Survey	NYS	1.0 km	MPC · JPL
436485	2011 EQ_{24}	—	October 29, 2005	Kitt Peak	Spacewatch	MAS	800 m	MPC · JPL
436486	2011 EU_{25}	—	March 5, 2011	Kitt Peak	Spacewatch	·	1.5 km	MPC · JPL
436487	2011 EX_{32}	—	October 1, 2005	Mount Lemmon	Mount Lemmon Survey	NYS	1.1 km	MPC · JPL
436488	2011 EM_{35}	—	January 10, 2007	Mount Lemmon	Mount Lemmon Survey	NYS	980 m	MPC · JPL
436489	2011 EF_{36}	—	March 6, 2011	Kitt Peak	Spacewatch	·	1.3 km	MPC · JPL
436490	2011 EO_{36}	—	March 6, 2011	Kitt Peak	Spacewatch	·	1.3 km	MPC · JPL
436491	2011 EF_{40}	—	September 18, 2009	Kitt Peak	Spacewatch	·	1.2 km	MPC · JPL
436492	2011 EA_{42}	—	February 25, 2011	Kitt Peak	Spacewatch	·	1.2 km	MPC · JPL
436493	2011 EL_{42}	—	February 25, 2011	Kitt Peak	Spacewatch	·	1.0 km	MPC · JPL
436494	2011 EX_{46}	—	January 28, 2011	Catalina	CSS	·	1.1 km	MPC · JPL
436495	2011 EB_{63}	—	January 22, 2006	Mount Lemmon	Mount Lemmon Survey	·	2.4 km	MPC · JPL
436496	2011 ET_{70}	—	February 22, 2011	Kitt Peak	Spacewatch	·	1.1 km	MPC · JPL
436497	2011 EA_{83}	—	May 6, 2000	Kitt Peak	Spacewatch	·	840 m	MPC · JPL
436498	2011 EH_{83}	—	March 6, 2011	Mount Lemmon	Mount Lemmon Survey	ERI	1.4 km	MPC · JPL
436499	2011 ET_{83}	—	December 15, 2006	Kitt Peak	Spacewatch	MAS	620 m	MPC · JPL
436500	2011 FU_{1}	—	February 17, 2007	Mount Lemmon	Mount Lemmon Survey	·	1.3 km	MPC · JPL

== 436501–436600 ==
back to top

Designation			Discovery			Properties		Ref
Permanent	Provisional	Named after	Date	Site	Discoverer(s)	Category	Diam.	Ref
436501	2011 FX_{1}	—	August 18, 2009	Kitt Peak	Spacewatch	·	1.3 km	MPC · JPL
436502	2011 FZ_{1}	—	January 17, 2007	Kitt Peak	Spacewatch	·	1.4 km	MPC · JPL
436503	2011 FN_{5}	—	March 11, 2007	Kitt Peak	Spacewatch	·	860 m	MPC · JPL
436504	2011 FG_{7}	—	February 11, 2011	Mount Lemmon	Mount Lemmon Survey	·	1.1 km	MPC · JPL
436505	2011 FO_{10}	—	March 16, 2007	Kitt Peak	Spacewatch	·	1.1 km	MPC · JPL
436506	2011 FE_{12}	—	January 30, 2011	Kitt Peak	Spacewatch	·	2.0 km	MPC · JPL
436507	2011 FA_{17}	—	March 18, 2004	Kitt Peak	Spacewatch	V	750 m	MPC · JPL
436508	2011 FW_{27}	—	January 27, 2007	Kitt Peak	Spacewatch	MAS	790 m	MPC · JPL
436509	2011 FZ_{29}	—	January 17, 2007	Kitt Peak	Spacewatch	NYS	990 m	MPC · JPL
436510	2011 FG_{36}	—	September 23, 2008	Mount Lemmon	Mount Lemmon Survey	·	1.1 km	MPC · JPL
436511	2011 FJ_{41}	—	November 21, 2006	Mount Lemmon	Mount Lemmon Survey	·	1.3 km	MPC · JPL
436512	2011 FC_{45}	—	March 11, 2007	Kitt Peak	Spacewatch	·	910 m	MPC · JPL
436513	2011 FM_{45}	—	October 1, 2005	Mount Lemmon	Mount Lemmon Survey	V	630 m	MPC · JPL
436514	2011 FP_{45}	—	November 4, 2005	Kitt Peak	Spacewatch	NYS	1.1 km	MPC · JPL
436515	2011 FO_{47}	—	October 10, 2004	Kitt Peak	Spacewatch	·	1.4 km	MPC · JPL
436516	2011 FA_{51}	—	February 8, 2007	Kitt Peak	Spacewatch	·	1.6 km	MPC · JPL
436517	2011 FY_{56}	—	September 29, 2005	Kitt Peak	Spacewatch	V	690 m	MPC · JPL
436518	2011 FQ_{63}	—	February 22, 2007	Catalina	CSS	·	1.1 km	MPC · JPL
436519	2011 FP_{80}	—	February 17, 2007	Kitt Peak	Spacewatch	·	1.2 km	MPC · JPL
436520	2011 FT_{82}	—	March 2, 2011	Kitt Peak	Spacewatch	·	1.1 km	MPC · JPL
436521	2011 FA_{121}	—	September 13, 2005	Kitt Peak	Spacewatch	·	1.2 km	MPC · JPL
436522	2011 FA_{126}	—	March 8, 2011	Kitt Peak	Spacewatch	·	1.7 km	MPC · JPL
436523	2011 FB_{127}	—	April 26, 2007	Mount Lemmon	Mount Lemmon Survey	EUN	1.4 km	MPC · JPL
436524	2011 FR_{127}	—	December 28, 2002	Kitt Peak	Spacewatch	·	1.7 km	MPC · JPL
436525	2011 FS_{128}	—	May 5, 2008	Mount Lemmon	Mount Lemmon Survey	·	620 m	MPC · JPL
436526	2011 FJ_{132}	—	January 20, 2010	WISE	WISE	·	3.8 km	MPC · JPL
436527	2011 FE_{133}	—	November 22, 2006	Mount Lemmon	Mount Lemmon Survey	NYS	960 m	MPC · JPL
436528	2011 FW_{133}	—	January 24, 2007	Mount Lemmon	Mount Lemmon Survey	MAS	560 m	MPC · JPL
436529	2011 FW_{140}	—	March 24, 2011	Kitt Peak	Spacewatch	·	2.2 km	MPC · JPL
436530	2011 FC_{142}	—	March 27, 2011	Mount Lemmon	Mount Lemmon Survey	·	890 m	MPC · JPL
436531	2011 FD_{143}	—	April 11, 2007	Kitt Peak	Spacewatch	·	1.1 km	MPC · JPL
436532	2011 FW_{147}	—	March 27, 2011	Mount Lemmon	Mount Lemmon Survey	·	1.1 km	MPC · JPL
436533	2011 FD_{153}	—	February 25, 2011	Kitt Peak	Spacewatch	V	830 m	MPC · JPL
436534	2011 FN_{154}	—	October 8, 2008	Kitt Peak	Spacewatch	·	1.2 km	MPC · JPL
436535	2011 FO_{154}	—	March 29, 2011	Kitt Peak	Spacewatch	·	1.1 km	MPC · JPL
436536	2011 GO_{3}	—	March 11, 2007	Kitt Peak	Spacewatch	·	1.7 km	MPC · JPL
436537	2011 GW_{3}	—	February 21, 2007	Mount Lemmon	Mount Lemmon Survey	·	1.1 km	MPC · JPL
436538	2011 GJ_{4}	—	September 6, 2008	Mount Lemmon	Mount Lemmon Survey	·	990 m	MPC · JPL
436539	2011 GO_{6}	—	April 2, 2011	Mount Lemmon	Mount Lemmon Survey	V	720 m	MPC · JPL
436540	2011 GC_{28}	—	October 28, 2005	Mount Lemmon	Mount Lemmon Survey	·	1.3 km	MPC · JPL
436541	2011 GF_{33}	—	November 23, 2009	Mount Lemmon	Mount Lemmon Survey	·	1.3 km	MPC · JPL
436542	2011 GZ_{42}	—	April 5, 2000	Socorro	LINEAR	MAS	720 m	MPC · JPL
436543	2011 GK_{46}	—	October 15, 2001	Kitt Peak	Spacewatch	·	1.3 km	MPC · JPL
436544	2011 GV_{46}	—	April 2, 2011	Kitt Peak	Spacewatch	·	1.6 km	MPC · JPL
436545	2011 GZ_{48}	—	March 13, 2011	Mount Lemmon	Mount Lemmon Survey	·	1.6 km	MPC · JPL
436546	2011 GY_{56}	—	March 28, 2011	Mount Lemmon	Mount Lemmon Survey	·	2.0 km	MPC · JPL
436547	2011 GK_{58}	—	May 1, 2003	Kitt Peak	Spacewatch	·	1.1 km	MPC · JPL
436548	2011 GW_{69}	—	April 14, 2007	Kitt Peak	Spacewatch	·	1.0 km	MPC · JPL
436549	2011 GE_{78}	—	September 15, 2004	Kitt Peak	Spacewatch	·	1.2 km	MPC · JPL
436550	2011 GA_{79}	—	February 6, 2007	Mount Lemmon	Mount Lemmon Survey	MAS	680 m	MPC · JPL
436551	2011 GD_{83}	—	April 23, 2007	Kitt Peak	Spacewatch	·	1.3 km	MPC · JPL
436552	2011 GR_{85}	—	January 16, 2011	Mount Lemmon	Mount Lemmon Survey	PHO	1.1 km	MPC · JPL
436553	2011 GV_{86}	—	April 3, 2011	Haleakala	Pan-STARRS 1	·	1.2 km	MPC · JPL
436554	2011 HF_{3}	—	March 29, 2010	WISE	WISE	KON	3.2 km	MPC · JPL
436555	2011 HS_{5}	—	March 4, 2011	Mount Lemmon	Mount Lemmon Survey	·	1.3 km	MPC · JPL
436556	2011 HB_{7}	—	May 13, 2007	Mount Lemmon	Mount Lemmon Survey	MAR	1.1 km	MPC · JPL
436557	2011 HX_{10}	—	February 17, 2007	Kitt Peak	Spacewatch	MAS	630 m	MPC · JPL
436558	2011 HU_{14}	—	March 31, 2003	Kitt Peak	Spacewatch	·	1.2 km	MPC · JPL
436559	2011 HE_{22}	—	March 19, 1996	Kitt Peak	Spacewatch	·	1.1 km	MPC · JPL
436560	2011 HB_{23}	—	April 1, 2011	Mount Lemmon	Mount Lemmon Survey	PHO	820 m	MPC · JPL
436561	2011 HY_{25}	—	December 12, 2004	Catalina	CSS	·	2.6 km	MPC · JPL
436562	2011 HY_{27}	—	February 23, 2007	Kitt Peak	Spacewatch	MAS	840 m	MPC · JPL
436563	2011 HJ_{31}	—	April 16, 2007	Mount Lemmon	Mount Lemmon Survey	·	930 m	MPC · JPL
436564	2011 HJ_{33}	—	March 28, 2011	Kitt Peak	Spacewatch	·	1.1 km	MPC · JPL
436565	2011 HJ_{43}	—	April 27, 2011	Kitt Peak	Spacewatch	·	2.2 km	MPC · JPL
436566	2011 HZ_{44}	—	April 15, 2007	Kitt Peak	Spacewatch	·	1.2 km	MPC · JPL
436567	2011 HL_{52}	—	November 21, 2009	Mount Lemmon	Mount Lemmon Survey	·	1.9 km	MPC · JPL
436568	2011 HB_{53}	—	April 29, 2011	Haleakala	Pan-STARRS 1	APO +1km	1.3 km	MPC · JPL
436569	2011 HH_{54}	—	March 29, 2011	Kitt Peak	Spacewatch	·	1.3 km	MPC · JPL
436570	2011 HP_{54}	—	September 29, 2008	Mount Lemmon	Mount Lemmon Survey	·	2.3 km	MPC · JPL
436571	2011 HR_{64}	—	December 7, 2005	Kitt Peak	Spacewatch	·	1.5 km	MPC · JPL
436572	2011 HV_{65}	—	February 21, 2007	Mount Lemmon	Mount Lemmon Survey	·	1.0 km	MPC · JPL
436573	2011 HL_{71}	—	November 2, 2005	Mount Lemmon	Mount Lemmon Survey	V	730 m	MPC · JPL
436574	2011 HY_{71}	—	April 26, 2011	Kitt Peak	Spacewatch	(5)	1.3 km	MPC · JPL
436575	2011 HV_{77}	—	November 18, 2008	Kitt Peak	Spacewatch	·	1.3 km	MPC · JPL
436576	2011 HR_{79}	—	June 7, 2007	Kitt Peak	Spacewatch	·	1.0 km	MPC · JPL
436577	2011 HZ_{84}	—	April 22, 2011	Kitt Peak	Spacewatch	·	1.7 km	MPC · JPL
436578	2011 HY_{91}	—	September 7, 2004	Kitt Peak	Spacewatch	NYS	890 m	MPC · JPL
436579	2011 HF_{97}	—	September 16, 2003	Kitt Peak	Spacewatch	·	1.2 km	MPC · JPL
436580	2011 HF_{98}	—	April 29, 2011	Kitt Peak	Spacewatch	·	960 m	MPC · JPL
436581	2011 HA_{99}	—	April 30, 2011	Mount Lemmon	Mount Lemmon Survey	·	880 m	MPC · JPL
436582	2011 HF_{100}	—	April 2, 2011	Kitt Peak	Spacewatch	·	1.3 km	MPC · JPL
436583	2011 HW_{100}	—	November 21, 2008	Kitt Peak	Spacewatch	·	1.4 km	MPC · JPL
436584	2011 JA_{2}	—	January 14, 2011	Mount Lemmon	Mount Lemmon Survey	·	1.2 km	MPC · JPL
436585	2011 JC_{7}	—	November 17, 2009	Mount Lemmon	Mount Lemmon Survey	·	1.3 km	MPC · JPL
436586	2011 JQ_{7}	—	May 6, 2011	Kitt Peak	Spacewatch	KON	1.9 km	MPC · JPL
436587	2011 JW_{8}	—	April 28, 2011	Kitt Peak	Spacewatch	EUN	1.4 km	MPC · JPL
436588	2011 JP_{10}	—	September 11, 2004	Socorro	LINEAR	·	4.5 km	MPC · JPL
436589	2011 JA_{21}	—	April 30, 2011	Kitt Peak	Spacewatch	EUN	1.1 km	MPC · JPL
436590	2011 JG_{21}	—	December 31, 2008	Mount Lemmon	Mount Lemmon Survey	·	1.5 km	MPC · JPL
436591	2011 JA_{27}	—	September 24, 2008	Mount Lemmon	Mount Lemmon Survey	·	1.5 km	MPC · JPL
436592	2011 JL_{27}	—	March 29, 2011	Kitt Peak	Spacewatch	EUN	1.4 km	MPC · JPL
436593	2011 JN_{27}	—	November 8, 2008	Kitt Peak	Spacewatch	·	1.6 km	MPC · JPL
436594	2011 KR_{2}	—	June 14, 2007	Kitt Peak	Spacewatch	·	1.1 km	MPC · JPL
436595	2011 KK_{3}	—	January 9, 2006	Kitt Peak	Spacewatch	·	1.7 km	MPC · JPL
436596	2011 KL_{3}	—	October 12, 1996	Kitt Peak	Spacewatch	·	1.7 km	MPC · JPL
436597	2011 KB_{5}	—	June 6, 2003	Kitt Peak	Spacewatch	·	1.5 km	MPC · JPL
436598	2011 KP_{5}	—	March 15, 2007	Mount Lemmon	Mount Lemmon Survey	·	1.4 km	MPC · JPL
436599	2011 KE_{7}	—	November 19, 2008	Catalina	CSS	MAR	1.4 km	MPC · JPL
436600	2011 KQ_{8}	—	October 10, 2008	Mount Lemmon	Mount Lemmon Survey	MAR	1.2 km	MPC · JPL

== 436601–436700 ==
back to top

Designation			Discovery			Properties		Ref
Permanent	Provisional	Named after	Date	Site	Discoverer(s)	Category	Diam.	Ref
436601	2011 KJ_{10}	—	December 24, 2005	Kitt Peak	Spacewatch	(5)	1.1 km	MPC · JPL
436602	2011 KY_{11}	—	November 11, 2004	Kitt Peak	Spacewatch	·	2.1 km	MPC · JPL
436603	2011 KF_{12}	—	November 11, 2004	Kitt Peak	Spacewatch	EUN	1.6 km	MPC · JPL
436604	2011 KR_{17}	—	May 23, 2011	Mount Lemmon	Mount Lemmon Survey	·	2.0 km	MPC · JPL
436605	2011 KW_{20}	—	January 7, 2010	Mount Lemmon	Mount Lemmon Survey	GEF	1.3 km	MPC · JPL
436606	2011 KD_{26}	—	October 5, 2007	Kitt Peak	Spacewatch	·	2.5 km	MPC · JPL
436607	2011 KH_{26}	—	September 15, 2007	Kitt Peak	Spacewatch	AGN	1.3 km	MPC · JPL
436608	2011 KP_{26}	—	May 9, 2007	Kitt Peak	Spacewatch	·	870 m	MPC · JPL
436609	2011 KC_{27}	—	October 27, 2008	Mount Lemmon	Mount Lemmon Survey	RAF	1.0 km	MPC · JPL
436610	2011 KK_{27}	—	May 11, 2011	Kitt Peak	Spacewatch	·	1.6 km	MPC · JPL
436611	2011 KE_{32}	—	November 10, 2004	Kitt Peak	Spacewatch	·	1.4 km	MPC · JPL
436612	2011 KH_{32}	—	May 10, 2007	Mount Lemmon	Mount Lemmon Survey	·	890 m	MPC · JPL
436613	2011 KK_{33}	—	September 20, 1995	Kitt Peak	Spacewatch	·	1.2 km	MPC · JPL
436614	2011 KT_{33}	—	December 30, 2005	Kitt Peak	Spacewatch	·	1.1 km	MPC · JPL
436615	2011 KK_{35}	—	September 24, 2008	Kitt Peak	Spacewatch	·	1.3 km	MPC · JPL
436616	2011 LC_{1}	—	September 11, 2007	Catalina	CSS	·	1.3 km	MPC · JPL
436617	2011 LE_{2}	—	June 3, 2011	Mount Lemmon	Mount Lemmon Survey	·	1.4 km	MPC · JPL
436618	2011 LU_{2}	—	September 27, 2006	Mount Lemmon	Mount Lemmon Survey	·	4.2 km	MPC · JPL
436619	2011 LN_{9}	—	April 18, 2007	Kitt Peak	Spacewatch	·	1.1 km	MPC · JPL
436620	2011 LF_{12}	—	November 1, 2008	Mount Lemmon	Mount Lemmon Survey	·	1.2 km	MPC · JPL
436621	2011 LN_{13}	—	June 3, 2011	Mount Lemmon	Mount Lemmon Survey	·	1.8 km	MPC · JPL
436622	2011 LO_{22}	—	April 27, 2011	Mount Lemmon	Mount Lemmon Survey	·	2.0 km	MPC · JPL
436623	2011 LQ_{24}	—	September 30, 2009	Mount Lemmon	Mount Lemmon Survey	·	2.3 km	MPC · JPL
436624	2011 MD_{3}	—	June 25, 2011	Mount Lemmon	Mount Lemmon Survey	·	1.8 km	MPC · JPL
436625	2011 MX_{3}	—	February 16, 2010	Mount Lemmon	Mount Lemmon Survey	JUN	930 m	MPC · JPL
436626	2011 MP_{4}	—	November 21, 2008	Kitt Peak	Spacewatch	·	1.7 km	MPC · JPL
436627	2011 MF_{5}	—	September 13, 2007	Catalina	CSS	JUN	1.4 km	MPC · JPL
436628	2011 OC_{2}	—	November 12, 2007	Mount Lemmon	Mount Lemmon Survey	EOS	1.9 km	MPC · JPL
436629	2011 OE_{2}	—	August 28, 2006	Catalina	CSS	·	2.1 km	MPC · JPL
436630	2011 OH_{20}	—	September 10, 2001	Anderson Mesa	LONEOS	·	2.3 km	MPC · JPL
436631	2011 OT_{21}	—	March 18, 2010	Kitt Peak	Spacewatch	·	2.0 km	MPC · JPL
436632	2011 OK_{26}	—	March 29, 2001	Kitt Peak	Spacewatch	·	2.0 km	MPC · JPL
436633	2011 OB_{46}	—	October 15, 2007	Mount Lemmon	Mount Lemmon Survey	·	1.9 km	MPC · JPL
436634	2011 PE_{7}	—	August 2, 2010	WISE	WISE	·	5.5 km	MPC · JPL
436635	2011 QQ_{9}	—	September 25, 2001	Socorro	LINEAR	·	2.1 km	MPC · JPL
436636	2011 QB_{12}	—	January 18, 2009	Mount Lemmon	Mount Lemmon Survey	EOS	2.0 km	MPC · JPL
436637	2011 QC_{17}	—	May 30, 2006	Mount Lemmon	Mount Lemmon Survey	·	1.8 km	MPC · JPL
436638	2011 QP_{17}	—	March 17, 2004	Kitt Peak	Spacewatch	·	2.0 km	MPC · JPL
436639	2011 QS_{18}	—	October 4, 2002	Socorro	LINEAR	·	1.7 km	MPC · JPL
436640	2011 QT_{18}	—	September 26, 2006	Mount Lemmon	Mount Lemmon Survey	EOS	1.8 km	MPC · JPL
436641	2011 QM_{19}	—	May 31, 2011	Mount Lemmon	Mount Lemmon Survey	·	3.2 km	MPC · JPL
436642	2011 QG_{22}	—	September 17, 2006	Kitt Peak	Spacewatch	·	1.9 km	MPC · JPL
436643	2011 QS_{23}	—	August 19, 2011	Haleakala	Pan-STARRS 1	EOS	2.5 km	MPC · JPL
436644	2011 QG_{25}	—	February 19, 2009	Kitt Peak	Spacewatch	·	2.7 km	MPC · JPL
436645	2011 QV_{26}	—	April 11, 2005	Mount Lemmon	Mount Lemmon Survey	·	2.6 km	MPC · JPL
436646	2011 QJ_{31}	—	August 24, 2011	XuYi	PMO NEO Survey Program	EOS	2.1 km	MPC · JPL
436647	2011 QN_{76}	—	September 30, 2006	Mount Lemmon	Mount Lemmon Survey	THM	2.3 km	MPC · JPL
436648	2011 QQ_{80}	—	December 3, 2007	Kitt Peak	Spacewatch	VER	3.3 km	MPC · JPL
436649	2011 QX_{98}	—	July 29, 2010	WISE	WISE	·	3.1 km	MPC · JPL
436650	2011 RB_{9}	—	May 13, 2010	Kitt Peak	Spacewatch	·	1.7 km	MPC · JPL
436651	2011 RC_{10}	—	November 5, 2007	Kitt Peak	Spacewatch	(13314)	2.8 km	MPC · JPL
436652	2011 RK_{11}	—	September 14, 1998	Xinglong	SCAP	·	2.1 km	MPC · JPL
436653	2011 RV_{11}	—	April 19, 2009	Mount Lemmon	Mount Lemmon Survey	·	3.1 km	MPC · JPL
436654	2011 RR_{12}	—	September 8, 2011	La Sagra	OAM	AMO	490 m	MPC · JPL
436655	2011 RC_{14}	—	March 10, 2005	Mount Lemmon	Mount Lemmon Survey	·	2.1 km	MPC · JPL
436656	2011 RR_{14}	—	September 24, 2000	Socorro	LINEAR	·	3.3 km	MPC · JPL
436657	2011 RG_{17}	—	September 17, 2006	Kitt Peak	Spacewatch	EOS	1.5 km	MPC · JPL
436658	2011 RO_{18}	—	November 23, 2006	Kitt Peak	Spacewatch	·	2.8 km	MPC · JPL
436659	2011 SU_{1}	—	August 29, 2005	Kitt Peak	Spacewatch	·	3.2 km	MPC · JPL
436660	2011 SF_{7}	—	October 31, 2006	Kitt Peak	Spacewatch	·	3.1 km	MPC · JPL
436661	2011 SX_{28}	—	May 21, 2010	Mount Lemmon	Mount Lemmon Survey	·	3.3 km	MPC · JPL
436662	2011 SX_{32}	—	June 19, 2010	Mount Lemmon	Mount Lemmon Survey	·	3.0 km	MPC · JPL
436663	2011 SF_{33}	—	June 9, 2011	Haleakala	Pan-STARRS 1	EUN	1.3 km	MPC · JPL
436664	2011 SZ_{33}	—	March 17, 2009	Kitt Peak	Spacewatch	·	2.7 km	MPC · JPL
436665	2011 ST_{52}	—	March 21, 2009	Mount Lemmon	Mount Lemmon Survey	EOS	1.6 km	MPC · JPL
436666	2011 ST_{54}	—	October 23, 2006	Mount Lemmon	Mount Lemmon Survey	·	2.7 km	MPC · JPL
436667	2011 SR_{60}	—	January 18, 2009	Kitt Peak	Spacewatch	·	2.2 km	MPC · JPL
436668	2011 SL_{63}	—	October 15, 2004	Mount Lemmon	Mount Lemmon Survey	T_{j} (2.97) · 3:2	5.2 km	MPC · JPL
436669	2011 SW_{66}	—	November 17, 2006	Mount Lemmon	Mount Lemmon Survey	·	3.3 km	MPC · JPL
436670	2011 SH_{69}	—	April 10, 2010	Mount Lemmon	Mount Lemmon Survey	·	2.2 km	MPC · JPL
436671	2011 SV_{71}	—	September 24, 2011	Haleakala	Pan-STARRS 1	AMO +1km · PHA	2.2 km	MPC · JPL
436672	2011 SQ_{80}	—	November 23, 2006	Mount Lemmon	Mount Lemmon Survey	·	2.9 km	MPC · JPL
436673	2011 SF_{97}	—	January 13, 2002	Kitt Peak	Spacewatch	·	3.8 km	MPC · JPL
436674	2011 SM_{100}	—	December 6, 2007	Kitt Peak	Spacewatch	·	2.5 km	MPC · JPL
436675	2011 SL_{113}	—	September 9, 2011	Kitt Peak	Spacewatch	·	3.1 km	MPC · JPL
436676	2011 SJ_{116}	—	February 20, 2009	Kitt Peak	Spacewatch	EMA	3.4 km	MPC · JPL
436677	2011 SG_{120}	—	February 10, 2008	Mount Lemmon	Mount Lemmon Survey	VER	2.5 km	MPC · JPL
436678	2011 SU_{122}	—	May 14, 2004	Kitt Peak	Spacewatch	·	3.2 km	MPC · JPL
436679	2011 SR_{126}	—	September 20, 2011	Kitt Peak	Spacewatch	HYG	2.9 km	MPC · JPL
436680	2011 SC_{138}	—	October 3, 2006	Mount Lemmon	Mount Lemmon Survey	EOS	1.7 km	MPC · JPL
436681	2011 SB_{141}	—	March 4, 2008	Kitt Peak	Spacewatch	CYB	3.8 km	MPC · JPL
436682	2011 SM_{143}	—	May 14, 2010	Mount Lemmon	Mount Lemmon Survey	·	2.8 km	MPC · JPL
436683	2011 SX_{144}	—	September 26, 2011	Kitt Peak	Spacewatch	·	2.7 km	MPC · JPL
436684	2011 SY_{147}	—	February 9, 2008	Kitt Peak	Spacewatch	·	2.7 km	MPC · JPL
436685	2011 SE_{157}	—	November 16, 2006	Kitt Peak	Spacewatch	·	2.6 km	MPC · JPL
436686	2011 SL_{168}	—	July 6, 2005	Kitt Peak	Spacewatch	·	2.3 km	MPC · JPL
436687	2011 SX_{180}	—	September 30, 2006	Mount Lemmon	Mount Lemmon Survey	·	1.7 km	MPC · JPL
436688	2011 SU_{185}	—	November 12, 2006	Mount Lemmon	Mount Lemmon Survey	·	2.9 km	MPC · JPL
436689	2011 SM_{194}	—	September 15, 2006	Kitt Peak	Spacewatch	·	1.8 km	MPC · JPL
436690	2011 SL_{196}	—	September 18, 2011	Mount Lemmon	Mount Lemmon Survey	·	1.8 km	MPC · JPL
436691	2011 SO_{198}	—	October 20, 2006	Kitt Peak	Spacewatch	·	2.5 km	MPC · JPL
436692	2011 SY_{199}	—	September 15, 2006	Kitt Peak	Spacewatch	·	1.9 km	MPC · JPL
436693	2011 SE_{215}	—	September 29, 2005	Mount Lemmon	Mount Lemmon Survey	·	4.3 km	MPC · JPL
436694	2011 SR_{225}	—	April 22, 2004	Kitt Peak	Spacewatch	·	3.0 km	MPC · JPL
436695	2011 ST_{247}	—	September 5, 2005	Siding Spring	SSS	T_{j} (2.98)	4.1 km	MPC · JPL
436696	2011 SF_{256}	—	August 28, 2005	Kitt Peak	Spacewatch	·	2.7 km	MPC · JPL
436697	2011 SL_{256}	—	September 14, 2005	Kitt Peak	Spacewatch	·	2.9 km	MPC · JPL
436698	2011 SX_{269}	—	April 2, 2009	Mount Lemmon	Mount Lemmon Survey	·	3.9 km	MPC · JPL
436699	2011 SS_{274}	—	February 21, 2010	WISE	WISE	·	3.7 km	MPC · JPL
436700	2011 SQ_{275}	—	September 30, 2006	Mount Lemmon	Mount Lemmon Survey	·	2.2 km	MPC · JPL

== 436701–436800 ==
back to top

Designation			Discovery			Properties		Ref
Permanent	Provisional	Named after	Date	Site	Discoverer(s)	Category	Diam.	Ref
436701	2011 ST_{275}	—	April 16, 2010	WISE	WISE	·	3.5 km	MPC · JPL
436702	2011 TZ_{1}	—	August 31, 2000	Socorro	LINEAR	·	4.4 km	MPC · JPL
436703	2011 TQ_{4}	—	July 1, 2011	Mount Lemmon	Mount Lemmon Survey	·	2.9 km	MPC · JPL
436704	2011 TO_{10}	—	March 30, 2010	WISE	WISE	·	3.1 km	MPC · JPL
436705	2011 TB_{11}	—	April 3, 2010	WISE	WISE	·	4.0 km	MPC · JPL
436706	2011 TZ_{12}	—	April 4, 2010	WISE	WISE	·	4.2 km	MPC · JPL
436707	2011 TW_{15}	—	October 26, 2000	Kitt Peak	Spacewatch	·	3.3 km	MPC · JPL
436708	2011 TZ_{16}	—	November 18, 2006	Kitt Peak	Spacewatch	·	2.7 km	MPC · JPL
436709	2011 UT_{17}	—	November 1, 2000	Kitt Peak	Spacewatch	·	3.9 km	MPC · JPL
436710	2011 UY_{19}	—	March 16, 2009	Kitt Peak	Spacewatch	·	3.7 km	MPC · JPL
436711	2011 UH_{46}	—	August 27, 2005	Anderson Mesa	LONEOS	·	3.2 km	MPC · JPL
436712	2011 UM_{57}	—	September 12, 2005	Kitt Peak	Spacewatch	THM	2.3 km	MPC · JPL
436713	2011 UU_{58}	—	December 14, 2006	Mount Lemmon	Mount Lemmon Survey	·	2.6 km	MPC · JPL
436714	2011 UC_{72}	—	April 22, 2004	Kitt Peak	Spacewatch	·	2.9 km	MPC · JPL
436715	2011 UG_{83}	—	November 19, 2006	Kitt Peak	Spacewatch	·	2.8 km	MPC · JPL
436716	2011 UN_{97}	—	November 11, 2006	Kitt Peak	Spacewatch	·	2.4 km	MPC · JPL
436717	2011 UV_{98}	—	October 20, 2011	Kitt Peak	Spacewatch	·	3.0 km	MPC · JPL
436718	2011 UL_{101}	—	September 30, 2005	Mount Lemmon	Mount Lemmon Survey	·	3.7 km	MPC · JPL
436719	2011 UB_{105}	—	November 17, 2006	Mount Lemmon	Mount Lemmon Survey	·	2.5 km	MPC · JPL
436720	2011 UN_{115}	—	October 17, 2006	Mount Lemmon	Mount Lemmon Survey	·	2.6 km	MPC · JPL
436721	2011 UM_{124}	—	November 20, 2006	Mount Lemmon	Mount Lemmon Survey	·	4.2 km	MPC · JPL
436722	2011 UW_{127}	—	October 20, 2011	Mount Lemmon	Mount Lemmon Survey	·	2.8 km	MPC · JPL
436723	2011 UB_{155}	—	September 7, 2011	Kitt Peak	Spacewatch	·	2.0 km	MPC · JPL
436724	2011 UW_{158}	—	October 25, 2011	Haleakala	Pan-STARRS 1	AMO · APO · PHA · fast	360 m	MPC · JPL
436725	2011 UP_{169}	—	August 31, 2005	Kitt Peak	Spacewatch	·	3.5 km	MPC · JPL
436726	2011 UD_{170}	—	January 13, 2008	Mount Lemmon	Mount Lemmon Survey	·	4.5 km	MPC · JPL
436727	2011 UB_{171}	—	October 23, 2006	Kitt Peak	Spacewatch	·	2.9 km	MPC · JPL
436728	2011 UC_{177}	—	October 6, 2011	Mount Lemmon	Mount Lemmon Survey	CYB	3.6 km	MPC · JPL
436729	2011 UO_{178}	—	September 24, 2000	Socorro	LINEAR	·	2.5 km	MPC · JPL
436730	2011 UL_{193}	—	September 24, 2000	Kitt Peak	Spacewatch	·	3.2 km	MPC · JPL
436731	2011 UO_{193}	—	November 20, 2001	Socorro	LINEAR	·	2.0 km	MPC · JPL
436732	2011 UV_{206}	—	April 21, 2004	Kitt Peak	Spacewatch	T_{j} (2.99)	3.0 km	MPC · JPL
436733	2011 UP_{271}	—	December 15, 2006	Kitt Peak	Spacewatch	·	3.2 km	MPC · JPL
436734	2011 UG_{292}	—	September 20, 2011	Kitt Peak	Spacewatch	ELF	2.8 km	MPC · JPL
436735	2011 UX_{299}	—	December 2, 1994	Kitt Peak	Spacewatch	·	3.5 km	MPC · JPL
436736	2011 UA_{328}	—	February 9, 2008	Kitt Peak	Spacewatch	·	2.7 km	MPC · JPL
436737	2011 UN_{355}	—	September 20, 2011	Kitt Peak	Spacewatch	·	2.8 km	MPC · JPL
436738	2011 UN_{405}	—	April 19, 2010	WISE	WISE	·	3.0 km	MPC · JPL
436739	2011 UK_{406}	—	August 6, 2005	Siding Spring	SSS	·	4.5 km	MPC · JPL
436740	2011 VN_{9}	—	September 25, 2005	Kitt Peak	Spacewatch	·	3.1 km	MPC · JPL
436741	2011 VN_{12}	—	May 13, 2004	Kitt Peak	Spacewatch	·	4.1 km	MPC · JPL
436742	2011 VG_{16}	—	March 25, 2010	WISE	WISE	·	3.5 km	MPC · JPL
436743	2011 VL_{16}	—	November 17, 2006	Kitt Peak	Spacewatch	·	2.4 km	MPC · JPL
436744	2011 VD_{18}	—	December 19, 2003	Socorro	LINEAR	H	730 m	MPC · JPL
436745	2011 WL_{18}	—	June 13, 2004	Kitt Peak	Spacewatch	·	3.4 km	MPC · JPL
436746	2011 WV_{23}	—	May 19, 2010	WISE	WISE	·	5.0 km	MPC · JPL
436747	2011 WJ_{45}	—	May 10, 2005	Catalina	CSS	H	650 m	MPC · JPL
436748	2011 WQ_{69}	—	November 16, 2006	Mount Lemmon	Mount Lemmon Survey	H	560 m	MPC · JPL
436749	2011 WC_{114}	—	June 6, 2005	Kitt Peak	Spacewatch	H	580 m	MPC · JPL
436750	2011 WG_{114}	—	December 17, 2001	Kitt Peak	Spacewatch	·	3.2 km	MPC · JPL
436751	2011 WF_{116}	—	May 12, 2005	Campo Imperatore	CINEOS	H	540 m	MPC · JPL
436752	2011 WP_{136}	—	November 30, 2011	Kitt Peak	Spacewatch	L4	10 km	MPC · JPL
436753	2011 WS_{141}	—	April 14, 2010	Mount Lemmon	Mount Lemmon Survey	H	430 m	MPC · JPL
436754	2011 YU_{11}	—	June 4, 2006	Kitt Peak	Spacewatch	L4	10 km	MPC · JPL
436755	2011 YG_{13}	—	November 8, 2010	Mount Lemmon	Mount Lemmon Survey	L4	7.8 km	MPC · JPL
436756	2011 YA_{59}	—	December 15, 2010	Mount Lemmon	Mount Lemmon Survey	L4	8.0 km	MPC · JPL
436757	2011 YT_{74}	—	June 10, 2010	Mount Lemmon	Mount Lemmon Survey	H	650 m	MPC · JPL
436758	2012 AD_{6}	—	January 18, 2010	WISE	WISE	L4	8.6 km	MPC · JPL
436759	2012 BS_{62}	—	April 11, 2010	Mount Lemmon	Mount Lemmon Survey	H	450 m	MPC · JPL
436760	2012 BW_{68}	—	January 28, 2000	Kitt Peak	Spacewatch	L4	8.7 km	MPC · JPL
436761	2012 DN	—	February 16, 2012	Haleakala	Pan-STARRS 1	APO +1km	2.8 km	MPC · JPL
436762	2012 FP_{23}	—	October 1, 2005	Mount Lemmon	Mount Lemmon Survey	H	570 m	MPC · JPL
436763	2012 FN_{52}	—	March 26, 2012	Catalina	CSS	APO +1km	840 m	MPC · JPL
436764	2012 FB_{57}	—	November 2, 2008	Mount Lemmon	Mount Lemmon Survey	AMO	450 m	MPC · JPL
436765	2012 FE_{81}	—	January 18, 2009	Kitt Peak	Spacewatch	H	580 m	MPC · JPL
436766	2012 FQ_{83}	—	April 12, 2004	Socorro	LINEAR	H	650 m	MPC · JPL
436767	2012 GW_{1}	—	April 14, 2004	Kitt Peak	Spacewatch	H	560 m	MPC · JPL
436768	2012 HT_{2}	—	February 19, 2009	Catalina	CSS	H	620 m	MPC · JPL
436769	2012 JQ_{1}	—	March 28, 2012	Kitt Peak	Spacewatch	·	440 m	MPC · JPL
436770	2012 JV_{3}	—	January 11, 2008	Mount Lemmon	Mount Lemmon Survey	·	630 m	MPC · JPL
436771	2012 JG_{11}	—	May 12, 2012	Mount Lemmon	Mount Lemmon Survey	ATE	560 m	MPC · JPL
436772	2012 JK_{32}	—	March 16, 2012	Mount Lemmon	Mount Lemmon Survey	·	670 m	MPC · JPL
436773	2012 JS_{64}	—	April 9, 2005	Mount Lemmon	Mount Lemmon Survey	·	560 m	MPC · JPL
436774	2012 KY_{3}	—	May 16, 2012	Catalina	CSS	APO · PHA	740 m	MPC · JPL
436775	2012 LC_{1}	—	June 8, 2012	Catalina	CSS	APO +1km	1.5 km	MPC · JPL
436776	2012 MK	—	August 29, 2006	Kitt Peak	Spacewatch	·	610 m	MPC · JPL
436777	2012 MQ_{2}	—	August 15, 2005	Siding Spring	SSS	·	720 m	MPC · JPL
436778	2012 MZ_{3}	—	April 7, 2008	Mount Lemmon	Mount Lemmon Survey	·	720 m	MPC · JPL
436779	2012 MY_{5}	—	October 22, 2006	Kitt Peak	Spacewatch	·	660 m	MPC · JPL
436780	2012 OT	—	March 12, 2005	Kitt Peak	Spacewatch	·	650 m	MPC · JPL
436781	2012 OZ_{3}	—	October 14, 2009	Mount Lemmon	Mount Lemmon Survey	V	590 m	MPC · JPL
436782	2012 PU_{2}	—	January 27, 2007	Mount Lemmon	Mount Lemmon Survey	·	1.0 km	MPC · JPL
436783	2012 PY_{4}	—	November 11, 2009	Kitt Peak	Spacewatch	·	940 m	MPC · JPL
436784	2012 PE_{10}	—	March 10, 2007	Mount Lemmon	Mount Lemmon Survey	·	1.0 km	MPC · JPL
436785	2012 PT_{10}	—	October 6, 2005	Kitt Peak	Spacewatch	·	930 m	MPC · JPL
436786	2012 PX_{14}	—	January 6, 2006	Kitt Peak	Spacewatch	·	1.1 km	MPC · JPL
436787	2012 PM_{17}	—	September 14, 2005	Catalina	CSS	·	1.2 km	MPC · JPL
436788	2012 PS_{20}	—	September 19, 2003	Kitt Peak	Spacewatch	·	1.5 km	MPC · JPL
436789	2012 PH_{30}	—	March 27, 2011	Mount Lemmon	Mount Lemmon Survey	(1547)	2.0 km	MPC · JPL
436790	2012 PN_{30}	—	August 31, 2005	Anderson Mesa	LONEOS	·	1.1 km	MPC · JPL
436791	2012 PS_{32}	—	December 5, 2002	Socorro	LINEAR	·	870 m	MPC · JPL
436792	2012 PM_{37}	—	June 2, 2008	Mount Lemmon	Mount Lemmon Survey	MAS	780 m	MPC · JPL
436793	2012 PS_{41}	—	September 28, 1994	Kitt Peak	Spacewatch	·	1.1 km	MPC · JPL
436794	2012 QY_{10}	—	November 30, 2000	Kitt Peak	Spacewatch	·	1.5 km	MPC · JPL
436795	2012 QW_{13}	—	October 24, 2008	Catalina	CSS	·	1.5 km	MPC · JPL
436796	2012 QF_{14}	—	January 16, 2005	Kitt Peak	Spacewatch	EUN	1.3 km	MPC · JPL
436797	2012 QG_{16}	—	September 12, 2001	Kitt Peak	Spacewatch	·	1.1 km	MPC · JPL
436798	2012 QL_{16}	—	July 5, 2005	Kitt Peak	Spacewatch	·	420 m	MPC · JPL
436799	2012 QW_{23}	—	September 14, 2005	Kitt Peak	Spacewatch	(2076)	740 m	MPC · JPL
436800	2012 QS_{27}	—	March 2, 2006	Kitt Peak	Spacewatch	·	1.5 km	MPC · JPL

== 436801–436900 ==
back to top

Designation			Discovery			Properties		Ref
Permanent	Provisional	Named after	Date	Site	Discoverer(s)	Category	Diam.	Ref
436801	2012 QW_{33}	—	May 31, 2008	Mount Lemmon	Mount Lemmon Survey	·	1.3 km	MPC · JPL
436802	2012 QA_{35}	—	October 24, 2009	Kitt Peak	Spacewatch	·	600 m	MPC · JPL
436803	2012 QE_{37}	—	September 23, 2008	Kitt Peak	Spacewatch	EUN	1.3 km	MPC · JPL
436804	2012 QZ_{37}	—	March 9, 2007	Mount Lemmon	Mount Lemmon Survey	·	1.3 km	MPC · JPL
436805	2012 QM_{40}	—	October 4, 2002	Socorro	LINEAR	·	740 m	MPC · JPL
436806	2012 QK_{51}	—	October 12, 2005	Kitt Peak	Spacewatch	·	910 m	MPC · JPL
436807	2012 RR_{2}	—	March 10, 2007	Mount Lemmon	Mount Lemmon Survey	·	1.2 km	MPC · JPL
436808	2012 RB_{4}	—	May 28, 2008	Mount Lemmon	Mount Lemmon Survey	NYS	1.3 km	MPC · JPL
436809	2012 RF_{7}	—	October 28, 1994	Kitt Peak	Spacewatch	·	1.0 km	MPC · JPL
436810	2012 RT_{7}	—	October 23, 2005	Catalina	CSS	·	1.3 km	MPC · JPL
436811	2012 RJ_{8}	—	April 30, 2011	Mount Lemmon	Mount Lemmon Survey	BRA	2.0 km	MPC · JPL
436812	2012 RL_{14}	—	April 23, 2001	Kitt Peak	Spacewatch	·	800 m	MPC · JPL
436813	2012 RU_{15}	—	October 13, 2005	Kitt Peak	Spacewatch	·	1.4 km	MPC · JPL
436814	2012 RL_{16}	—	September 3, 2008	Kitt Peak	Spacewatch	·	1.3 km	MPC · JPL
436815	2012 RZ_{23}	—	September 14, 2012	Kitt Peak	Spacewatch	·	1.4 km	MPC · JPL
436816	2012 RD_{24}	—	September 14, 2012	Kitt Peak	Spacewatch	EOS	2.0 km	MPC · JPL
436817	2012 RK_{24}	—	September 15, 2012	Mount Lemmon	Mount Lemmon Survey	·	2.1 km	MPC · JPL
436818	2012 RK_{26}	—	July 30, 2008	Mount Lemmon	Mount Lemmon Survey	·	1.1 km	MPC · JPL
436819	2012 RS_{26}	—	September 18, 2001	Anderson Mesa	LONEOS	ERI	1.3 km	MPC · JPL
436820	2012 RL_{27}	—	September 11, 2004	Socorro	LINEAR	·	1.3 km	MPC · JPL
436821	2012 RO_{27}	—	September 12, 2001	Socorro	LINEAR	NYS	1.0 km	MPC · JPL
436822	2012 RX_{27}	—	October 9, 1999	Kitt Peak	Spacewatch	·	590 m	MPC · JPL
436823	2012 RB_{29}	—	May 13, 2004	Kitt Peak	Spacewatch	·	1.1 km	MPC · JPL
436824	2012 RO_{33}	—	August 13, 2012	Kitt Peak	Spacewatch	·	1.2 km	MPC · JPL
436825	2012 RM_{34}	—	September 15, 2012	Kitt Peak	Spacewatch	(43176)	3.1 km	MPC · JPL
436826	2012 RX_{35}	—	December 5, 2008	Kitt Peak	Spacewatch	·	1.9 km	MPC · JPL
436827	2012 RB_{36}	—	April 22, 2007	Mount Lemmon	Mount Lemmon Survey	V	840 m	MPC · JPL
436828	2012 RZ_{36}	—	December 31, 2005	Kitt Peak	Spacewatch	·	1.0 km	MPC · JPL
436829	2012 SX_{3}	—	August 10, 2007	Kitt Peak	Spacewatch	·	1.6 km	MPC · JPL
436830	2012 SZ_{4}	—	October 1, 2008	Kitt Peak	Spacewatch	·	1.4 km	MPC · JPL
436831	2012 SK_{7}	—	February 17, 2010	Kitt Peak	Spacewatch	TEL	1.4 km	MPC · JPL
436832	2012 SM_{7}	—	September 15, 2012	Catalina	CSS	·	1.7 km	MPC · JPL
436833	2012 SH_{9}	—	March 17, 2010	Kitt Peak	Spacewatch	·	2.3 km	MPC · JPL
436834	2012 SJ_{9}	—	October 23, 2003	Kitt Peak	Spacewatch	·	1.9 km	MPC · JPL
436835	2012 SD_{10}	—	October 21, 1995	Kitt Peak	Spacewatch	·	1.8 km	MPC · JPL
436836	2012 SZ_{11}	—	April 5, 2011	Mount Lemmon	Mount Lemmon Survey	MAS	680 m	MPC · JPL
436837	2012 SL_{12}	—	September 17, 2012	Kitt Peak	Spacewatch	·	2.0 km	MPC · JPL
436838	2012 SO_{12}	—	September 7, 2008	Mount Lemmon	Mount Lemmon Survey	·	1.1 km	MPC · JPL
436839	2012 SW_{12}	—	September 1, 1998	Kitt Peak	Spacewatch	GEF	1.4 km	MPC · JPL
436840	2012 SA_{13}	—	September 17, 2012	Kitt Peak	Spacewatch	·	1.9 km	MPC · JPL
436841	2012 SF_{16}	—	October 24, 2003	Kitt Peak	Spacewatch	·	1.9 km	MPC · JPL
436842	2012 SX_{16}	—	September 15, 2006	Kitt Peak	Spacewatch	·	2.9 km	MPC · JPL
436843	2012 SQ_{18}	—	September 22, 2003	Kitt Peak	Spacewatch	·	1.9 km	MPC · JPL
436844	2012 SC_{19}	—	September 15, 2007	Kitt Peak	Spacewatch	·	2.2 km	MPC · JPL
436845	2012 SF_{19}	—	September 17, 2012	Kitt Peak	Spacewatch	NEM	2.2 km	MPC · JPL
436846	2012 SA_{21}	—	February 16, 2010	Kitt Peak	Spacewatch	·	1.9 km	MPC · JPL
436847	2012 SS_{23}	—	April 24, 2006	Kitt Peak	Spacewatch	·	2.0 km	MPC · JPL
436848	2012 SH_{26}	—	September 27, 2003	Kitt Peak	Spacewatch	·	1.7 km	MPC · JPL
436849	2012 SJ_{26}	—	October 1, 2008	Kitt Peak	Spacewatch	·	1.3 km	MPC · JPL
436850	2012 SZ_{26}	—	October 14, 2001	Kitt Peak	Spacewatch	CLA	1.7 km	MPC · JPL
436851	2012 SU_{27}	—	September 30, 2003	Kitt Peak	Spacewatch	·	2.3 km	MPC · JPL
436852	2012 SC_{33}	—	October 26, 2005	Kitt Peak	Spacewatch	·	1.4 km	MPC · JPL
436853	2012 SA_{36}	—	September 23, 2008	Mount Lemmon	Mount Lemmon Survey	·	1.1 km	MPC · JPL
436854	2012 SH_{48}	—	February 27, 2006	Kitt Peak	Spacewatch	·	1.9 km	MPC · JPL
436855	2012 SF_{49}	—	September 23, 2012	Mount Lemmon	Mount Lemmon Survey	AST	1.7 km	MPC · JPL
436856	2012 SW_{50}	—	October 4, 1996	Kitt Peak	Spacewatch	·	1.0 km	MPC · JPL
436857	2012 SB_{51}	—	September 23, 2008	Kitt Peak	Spacewatch	(5)	1.1 km	MPC · JPL
436858	2012 SC_{51}	—	September 16, 2012	Catalina	CSS	·	2.6 km	MPC · JPL
436859	2012 SR_{58}	—	December 28, 2005	Mount Lemmon	Mount Lemmon Survey	·	1.2 km	MPC · JPL
436860	2012 SB_{59}	—	August 31, 2005	Kitt Peak	Spacewatch	·	560 m	MPC · JPL
436861	2012 SE_{59}	—	November 18, 2001	Socorro	LINEAR	MAS	760 m	MPC · JPL
436862	2012 SA_{60}	—	November 19, 2003	Anderson Mesa	LONEOS	·	2.6 km	MPC · JPL
436863	2012 SK_{60}	—	October 4, 1994	Kitt Peak	Spacewatch	·	930 m	MPC · JPL
436864	2012 SX_{63}	—	December 17, 2003	Kitt Peak	Spacewatch	·	2.3 km	MPC · JPL
436865	2012 TL_{6}	—	October 22, 2005	Kitt Peak	Spacewatch	MAS	780 m	MPC · JPL
436866	2012 TZ_{10}	—	October 6, 2012	Mount Lemmon	Mount Lemmon Survey	EOS	2.0 km	MPC · JPL
436867	2012 TU_{11}	—	November 1, 2008	Mount Lemmon	Mount Lemmon Survey	·	1.5 km	MPC · JPL
436868	2012 TX_{13}	—	October 13, 1999	Socorro	LINEAR	EUN	1.2 km	MPC · JPL
436869	2012 TJ_{14}	—	July 6, 2005	Siding Spring	SSS	·	870 m	MPC · JPL
436870	2012 TZ_{15}	—	October 12, 2007	Mount Lemmon	Mount Lemmon Survey	KOR	1.3 km	MPC · JPL
436871	2012 TF_{18}	—	September 21, 2008	Mount Lemmon	Mount Lemmon Survey	NYS	1.1 km	MPC · JPL
436872	2012 TP_{19}	—	October 22, 2005	Kitt Peak	Spacewatch	·	950 m	MPC · JPL
436873	2012 TQ_{21}	—	October 1, 2003	Kitt Peak	Spacewatch	·	1.6 km	MPC · JPL
436874	2012 TL_{22}	—	October 6, 1999	Socorro	LINEAR	·	1.8 km	MPC · JPL
436875	2012 TA_{23}	—	October 6, 2008	Mount Lemmon	Mount Lemmon Survey	·	1.9 km	MPC · JPL
436876	2012 TH_{23}	—	October 8, 2012	Mount Lemmon	Mount Lemmon Survey	·	1.6 km	MPC · JPL
436877	2012 TK_{23}	—	June 19, 2004	Kitt Peak	Spacewatch	SUL	2.3 km	MPC · JPL
436878	2012 TP_{24}	—	October 6, 2008	Kitt Peak	Spacewatch	·	1.4 km	MPC · JPL
436879	2012 TC_{25}	—	September 16, 2003	Kitt Peak	Spacewatch	·	1.7 km	MPC · JPL
436880	2012 TM_{26}	—	December 4, 2005	Kitt Peak	Spacewatch	·	1.1 km	MPC · JPL
436881	2012 TZ_{26}	—	October 6, 2012	Mount Lemmon	Mount Lemmon Survey	·	2.2 km	MPC · JPL
436882	2012 TP_{28}	—	September 28, 2003	Kitt Peak	Spacewatch	·	1.6 km	MPC · JPL
436883	2012 TT_{28}	—	September 15, 2007	Kitt Peak	Spacewatch	·	1.8 km	MPC · JPL
436884	2012 TG_{30}	—	April 9, 2010	Mount Lemmon	Mount Lemmon Survey	·	1.9 km	MPC · JPL
436885	2012 TL_{30}	—	September 23, 2008	Kitt Peak	Spacewatch	EUN	920 m	MPC · JPL
436886	2012 TQ_{30}	—	July 30, 2008	Mount Lemmon	Mount Lemmon Survey	MAS	660 m	MPC · JPL
436887	2012 TS_{30}	—	September 16, 2003	Kitt Peak	Spacewatch	·	1.7 km	MPC · JPL
436888	2012 TO_{33}	—	October 6, 2012	Mount Lemmon	Mount Lemmon Survey	·	3.2 km	MPC · JPL
436889	2012 TC_{34}	—	March 24, 2006	Mount Lemmon	Mount Lemmon Survey	·	1.9 km	MPC · JPL
436890	2012 TX_{34}	—	February 20, 2009	Catalina	CSS	·	3.4 km	MPC · JPL
436891	2012 TT_{40}	—	April 7, 2010	WISE	WISE	·	3.8 km	MPC · JPL
436892	2012 TQ_{41}	—	October 8, 2012	Mount Lemmon	Mount Lemmon Survey	·	2.3 km	MPC · JPL
436893	2012 TG_{50}	—	December 22, 2008	Kitt Peak	Spacewatch	KOR	1.4 km	MPC · JPL
436894	2012 TV_{50}	—	October 20, 2008	Mount Lemmon	Mount Lemmon Survey	·	1.4 km	MPC · JPL
436895	2012 TO_{51}	—	August 23, 2007	Kitt Peak	Spacewatch	·	1.6 km	MPC · JPL
436896	2012 TQ_{53}	—	September 22, 2003	Kitt Peak	Spacewatch	·	1.7 km	MPC · JPL
436897	2012 TZ_{54}	—	December 15, 2004	Kitt Peak	Spacewatch	(5)	1.2 km	MPC · JPL
436898	2012 TW_{55}	—	September 15, 2012	Kitt Peak	Spacewatch	·	2.7 km	MPC · JPL
436899	2012 TN_{64}	—	October 26, 2008	Kitt Peak	Spacewatch	·	1.3 km	MPC · JPL
436900	2012 TW_{67}	—	August 28, 2012	Mount Lemmon	Mount Lemmon Survey	AEO	1.2 km	MPC · JPL

== 436901–437000 ==
back to top

Designation			Discovery			Properties		Ref
Permanent	Provisional	Named after	Date	Site	Discoverer(s)	Category	Diam.	Ref
436901	2012 TB_{68}	—	March 30, 2011	Mount Lemmon	Mount Lemmon Survey	ERI	1.5 km	MPC · JPL
436902	2012 TD_{69}	—	October 8, 2012	Mount Lemmon	Mount Lemmon Survey	·	3.2 km	MPC · JPL
436903	2012 TP_{70}	—	July 25, 2006	Mount Lemmon	Mount Lemmon Survey	·	3.0 km	MPC · JPL
436904	2012 TQ_{71}	—	November 16, 2003	Kitt Peak	Spacewatch	·	2.1 km	MPC · JPL
436905	2012 TS_{71}	—	September 28, 2003	Kitt Peak	Spacewatch	·	1.8 km	MPC · JPL
436906	2012 TG_{74}	—	September 5, 2007	Mount Lemmon	Mount Lemmon Survey	AGN	1.1 km	MPC · JPL
436907	2012 TG_{77}	—	October 19, 2006	Catalina	CSS	URS	3.0 km	MPC · JPL
436908	2012 TA_{80}	—	September 29, 1997	Kitt Peak	Spacewatch	·	910 m	MPC · JPL
436909	2012 TD_{81}	—	October 9, 2007	Kitt Peak	Spacewatch	·	2.5 km	MPC · JPL
436910	2012 TA_{82}	—	May 5, 2010	Mount Lemmon	Mount Lemmon Survey	·	3.5 km	MPC · JPL
436911	2012 TP_{82}	—	September 19, 2003	Kitt Peak	Spacewatch	·	2.2 km	MPC · JPL
436912	2012 TC_{87}	—	December 24, 2005	Kitt Peak	Spacewatch	·	1.2 km	MPC · JPL
436913	2012 TD_{88}	—	September 13, 2007	Mount Lemmon	Mount Lemmon Survey	KOR	1.3 km	MPC · JPL
436914	2012 TA_{90}	—	November 1, 2008	Mount Lemmon	Mount Lemmon Survey	·	1.5 km	MPC · JPL
436915	2012 TR_{93}	—	March 13, 2011	Mount Lemmon	Mount Lemmon Survey	·	1.3 km	MPC · JPL
436916	2012 TY_{95}	—	September 16, 2012	Kitt Peak	Spacewatch	EOS	2.3 km	MPC · JPL
436917	2012 TG_{96}	—	September 22, 2008	Kitt Peak	Spacewatch	·	1.4 km	MPC · JPL
436918	2012 TH_{96}	—	June 5, 2010	WISE	WISE	·	2.2 km	MPC · JPL
436919	2012 TE_{97}	—	September 4, 2008	Kitt Peak	Spacewatch	·	2.1 km	MPC · JPL
436920	2012 TZ_{97}	—	October 4, 1997	Kitt Peak	Spacewatch	·	1.0 km	MPC · JPL
436921	2012 TX_{99}	—	October 21, 2008	Kitt Peak	Spacewatch	(5)	1.4 km	MPC · JPL
436922	2012 TR_{100}	—	August 15, 1993	Kitt Peak	Spacewatch	·	1.1 km	MPC · JPL
436923	2012 TA_{101}	—	October 21, 2003	Kitt Peak	Spacewatch	·	2.1 km	MPC · JPL
436924	2012 TW_{102}	—	September 29, 2005	Kitt Peak	Spacewatch	·	490 m	MPC · JPL
436925	2012 TA_{104}	—	September 15, 2007	Mount Lemmon	Mount Lemmon Survey	EOS	1.9 km	MPC · JPL
436926	2012 TM_{105}	—	January 22, 2010	WISE	WISE	·	4.7 km	MPC · JPL
436927	2012 TV_{108}	—	October 10, 2012	Mount Lemmon	Mount Lemmon Survey	·	2.1 km	MPC · JPL
436928	2012 TE_{111}	—	September 21, 2012	Kitt Peak	Spacewatch	·	2.3 km	MPC · JPL
436929	2012 TT_{112}	—	October 10, 2007	Mount Lemmon	Mount Lemmon Survey	·	1.8 km	MPC · JPL
436930	2012 TE_{116}	—	September 21, 2012	Kitt Peak	Spacewatch	·	3.2 km	MPC · JPL
436931	2012 TG_{116}	—	October 1, 2003	Kitt Peak	Spacewatch	·	2.1 km	MPC · JPL
436932	2012 TJ_{120}	—	December 7, 2008	Mount Lemmon	Mount Lemmon Survey	·	1.5 km	MPC · JPL
436933	2012 TC_{125}	—	May 28, 2003	Kitt Peak	Spacewatch	·	1.3 km	MPC · JPL
436934	2012 TF_{125}	—	November 20, 2001	Socorro	LINEAR	NYS	1.4 km	MPC · JPL
436935	2012 TO_{125}	—	December 25, 2005	Kitt Peak	Spacewatch	·	1.6 km	MPC · JPL
436936	2012 TB_{127}	—	April 11, 2005	Mount Lemmon	Mount Lemmon Survey	·	1.9 km	MPC · JPL
436937	2012 TE_{130}	—	September 27, 2003	Kitt Peak	Spacewatch	·	1.8 km	MPC · JPL
436938	2012 TK_{131}	—	October 8, 2012	Mount Lemmon	Mount Lemmon Survey	·	3.2 km	MPC · JPL
436939	2012 TS_{131}	—	August 18, 2007	XuYi	PMO NEO Survey Program	·	2.4 km	MPC · JPL
436940	2012 TU_{131}	—	October 21, 2003	Kitt Peak	Spacewatch	·	3.9 km	MPC · JPL
436941	2012 TE_{133}	—	March 15, 2004	Kitt Peak	Spacewatch	EOS	1.8 km	MPC · JPL
436942	2012 TO_{133}	—	October 8, 2008	Mount Lemmon	Mount Lemmon Survey	·	1.7 km	MPC · JPL
436943	2012 TX_{135}	—	March 18, 2010	Mount Lemmon	Mount Lemmon Survey	AGN	1.0 km	MPC · JPL
436944	2012 TZ_{135}	—	November 3, 2008	Kitt Peak	Spacewatch	·	2.1 km	MPC · JPL
436945	2012 TE_{138}	—	October 10, 2004	Kitt Peak	Spacewatch	·	1.1 km	MPC · JPL
436946	2012 TO_{138}	—	October 29, 2008	Kitt Peak	Spacewatch	·	1.4 km	MPC · JPL
436947	2012 TK_{140}	—	October 30, 2005	Catalina	CSS	·	860 m	MPC · JPL
436948	2012 TO_{142}	—	September 11, 2012	Siding Spring	SSS	(5)	1.2 km	MPC · JPL
436949	2012 TE_{147}	—	August 4, 2008	Siding Spring	SSS	·	1.4 km	MPC · JPL
436950	2012 TW_{148}	—	September 25, 2012	Catalina	CSS	NEM	2.2 km	MPC · JPL
436951	2012 TO_{149}	—	October 16, 2001	Kitt Peak	Spacewatch	·	2.6 km	MPC · JPL
436952	2012 TT_{149}	—	December 4, 2007	Mount Lemmon	Mount Lemmon Survey	·	2.1 km	MPC · JPL
436953	2012 TW_{151}	—	May 24, 2011	Mount Lemmon	Mount Lemmon Survey	(5)	1.1 km	MPC · JPL
436954	2012 TC_{152}	—	September 13, 2007	Mount Lemmon	Mount Lemmon Survey	AGN	1.0 km	MPC · JPL
436955	2012 TD_{152}	—	September 13, 2007	Mount Lemmon	Mount Lemmon Survey	·	1.9 km	MPC · JPL
436956	2012 TS_{153}	—	September 17, 2012	Kitt Peak	Spacewatch	·	2.8 km	MPC · JPL
436957	2012 TC_{155}	—	October 1, 2003	Kitt Peak	Spacewatch	·	1.8 km	MPC · JPL
436958	2012 TE_{157}	—	January 27, 2010	WISE	WISE	VER	2.4 km	MPC · JPL
436959	2012 TE_{158}	—	October 26, 2008	Mount Lemmon	Mount Lemmon Survey	·	1.6 km	MPC · JPL
436960	2012 TQ_{158}	—	October 14, 2007	Mount Lemmon	Mount Lemmon Survey	EOS	1.8 km	MPC · JPL
436961	2012 TB_{159}	—	February 20, 2009	Kitt Peak	Spacewatch	·	2.8 km	MPC · JPL
436962	2012 TX_{161}	—	September 13, 2007	Mount Lemmon	Mount Lemmon Survey	KOR	1.1 km	MPC · JPL
436963	2012 TL_{168}	—	December 6, 2005	Kitt Peak	Spacewatch	·	1.7 km	MPC · JPL
436964	2012 TK_{169}	—	June 25, 2010	WISE	WISE	PAD	2.2 km	MPC · JPL
436965	2012 TU_{170}	—	April 11, 2010	Kitt Peak	Spacewatch	·	1.7 km	MPC · JPL
436966	2012 TR_{172}	—	March 12, 2010	Kitt Peak	Spacewatch	·	1.8 km	MPC · JPL
436967	2012 TT_{173}	—	August 28, 2006	Kitt Peak	Spacewatch	·	2.5 km	MPC · JPL
436968	2012 TY_{173}	—	October 2, 2008	Kitt Peak	Spacewatch	·	1.3 km	MPC · JPL
436969	2012 TW_{174}	—	November 7, 2007	Kitt Peak	Spacewatch	·	2.4 km	MPC · JPL
436970	2012 TZ_{174}	—	October 22, 2003	Kitt Peak	Spacewatch	·	2.3 km	MPC · JPL
436971	2012 TH_{175}	—	September 11, 2007	Mount Lemmon	Mount Lemmon Survey	KOR	1.4 km	MPC · JPL
436972	2012 TC_{176}	—	April 26, 2000	Kitt Peak	Spacewatch	NYS	1.0 km	MPC · JPL
436973	2012 TN_{179}	—	September 5, 2008	Kitt Peak	Spacewatch	·	1.2 km	MPC · JPL
436974	2012 TU_{184}	—	May 6, 2010	Mount Lemmon	Mount Lemmon Survey	EOS	2.0 km	MPC · JPL
436975	2012 TV_{186}	—	October 9, 2012	Mount Lemmon	Mount Lemmon Survey	VER	2.6 km	MPC · JPL
436976	2012 TH_{189}	—	October 10, 2012	Kitt Peak	Spacewatch	THM	2.1 km	MPC · JPL
436977	2012 TM_{189}	—	April 23, 2007	Kitt Peak	Spacewatch	·	1.4 km	MPC · JPL
436978	2012 TO_{194}	—	November 4, 2005	Kitt Peak	Spacewatch	·	2.3 km	MPC · JPL
436979	2012 TW_{196}	—	September 20, 2006	Kitt Peak	Spacewatch	VER	2.6 km	MPC · JPL
436980	2012 TH_{198}	—	November 19, 2008	Mount Lemmon	Mount Lemmon Survey	AGN	1.3 km	MPC · JPL
436981	2012 TN_{199}	—	October 4, 2007	Kitt Peak	Spacewatch	EOS	1.9 km	MPC · JPL
436982	2012 TO_{199}	—	October 20, 2001	Socorro	LINEAR	MAS	770 m	MPC · JPL
436983	2012 TH_{202}	—	October 26, 2005	Kitt Peak	Spacewatch	NYS	1.0 km	MPC · JPL
436984	2012 TW_{202}	—	December 19, 2009	Mount Lemmon	Mount Lemmon Survey	·	2.3 km	MPC · JPL
436985	2012 TP_{206}	—	September 15, 2006	Kitt Peak	Spacewatch	·	3.3 km	MPC · JPL
436986	2012 TZ_{207}	—	December 21, 2008	Mount Lemmon	Mount Lemmon Survey	(16286)	2.0 km	MPC · JPL
436987	2012 TH_{208}	—	February 20, 2009	Mount Lemmon	Mount Lemmon Survey	·	2.8 km	MPC · JPL
436988	2012 TJ_{208}	—	October 11, 2012	Kitt Peak	Spacewatch	WIT	990 m	MPC · JPL
436989	2012 TW_{211}	—	October 20, 1997	Xinglong	SCAP	·	1.1 km	MPC · JPL
436990	2012 TH_{214}	—	October 17, 2003	Kitt Peak	Spacewatch	·	2.2 km	MPC · JPL
436991	2012 TQ_{214}	—	January 26, 2010	WISE	WISE	·	3.3 km	MPC · JPL
436992	2012 TW_{215}	—	December 23, 2001	Kitt Peak	Spacewatch	·	1.1 km	MPC · JPL
436993	2012 TG_{216}	—	October 18, 2003	Kitt Peak	Spacewatch	·	2.4 km	MPC · JPL
436994	2012 TB_{217}	—	September 22, 2003	Kitt Peak	Spacewatch	·	1.9 km	MPC · JPL
436995	2012 TP_{217}	—	October 12, 2005	Kitt Peak	Spacewatch	·	920 m	MPC · JPL
436996	2012 TV_{217}	—	September 26, 2008	Kitt Peak	Spacewatch	·	1.1 km	MPC · JPL
436997	2012 TL_{219}	—	September 15, 2012	Kitt Peak	Spacewatch	·	820 m	MPC · JPL
436998	2012 TC_{220}	—	August 10, 2007	Kitt Peak	Spacewatch	·	2.0 km	MPC · JPL
436999	2012 TV_{220}	—	September 24, 2008	Kitt Peak	Spacewatch	EUN	950 m	MPC · JPL
437000	2012 TZ_{220}	—	October 18, 2003	Kitt Peak	Spacewatch	AGN	1.1 km	MPC · JPL

back to top

== Meaning of names ==
As minor planet discoveries are confirmed, they are given a permanent number by the IAU's Minor Planet Center (MPC), and the discoverers can then submit names for them, following the IAU's naming conventions. The list below concerns those minor planets in the specified number-range that have received names, and explains the meanings of those names.

Official naming citations of newly named small Solar System bodies are approved and published in a bulletin by IAU's Working Group for Small Bodies Nomenclature (WGSBN). Before May 2021, citations were published in MPC's Minor Planet Circulars for many decades. Recent citations can also be found on the JPL Small-Body Database (SBDB). Until his death in 2016, German astronomer Lutz D. Schmadel compiled these citations into the Dictionary of Minor Planet Names (DMP) and regularly updated the collection.

Based on Paul Herget's The Names of the Minor Planets, Schmadel also researched the unclear origin of numerous asteroids, most of which had been named prior to World War II. This article incorporates text from this source, which is in the public domain: SBDB New namings may only be added to this list below after official publication as the preannouncement of names is condemned. The WGSBN publishes a comprehensive guideline for the naming rules of non-cometary small Solar System bodies.

Named minor planet	Provisional	This minor planet was named for...	Ref · Catalog
436048 Fritzhuber	2009 QE_{26}	Fritz Huber (1958–2015) was a leading member of the core team of the first solar-powered observatory in Oberreith, Bavaria, Germany.	MPC · 436048
436149 Edabel	2009 VL	Ed Abel (born 1944) is an active member of the Mountain Meadows, West Virginia, astronomy group.	JPL · 436149
