= Hoover =

Hoover may refer to:

== Music ==
- Hoover (band), an American post-hardcore band
- Hooverphonic, a Belgian band originally named Hoover
- Hoover (singer), Willis Hoover, a country and western performer active in 1960s and '70s
- "Hoover" (song), a 2016 song by Swedish rapper Yung Lean
- Hoover sound, a heavy bass driven drone sound used in electronic music
- Hoover (composer), Katherine Hoover an American contemporary classical music and chamber music composer.

== People ==
- Hoover (surname)
  - Herbert Hoover, (1874–1964) 31st president of the United States
  - J. Edgar Hoover (1895–1972), first director of the Federal Bureau of Investigation (FBI)
- Hoover Orsi (born 1978), Brazilian race car driver
- Hoover J. Wright (1928–2003), American football and track and field coach

== Places in the United States ==
- Hoover, Alabama, the 6th largest city in Alabama
- Hoover, Indiana
- Hoover, Missouri
- Hoover, Oklahoma
- Hoover, South Dakota
- Hoover, Texas
- Hoover Dam, on the Colorado River, Nevada and Arizona
- Hoover Dam (Ohio), on the Big Walnut Creek
- Hoover Field, Washington, D.C.'s first airport, located where the Pentagon now stands
- Hoover Tower, an 87-metre (285 ft) structure on the campus of Stanford University
- Eli Hoover House and Confectionery, historic home and confectionery in Muncie, Indiana

== Schools ==
- Hoover High School (disambiguation)
- Hoover Elementary School (disambiguation)

== Other uses ==
- The Hoover Company, a manufacturer of appliances, especially vacuum cleaners
- Vacuum cleaner, called by the generic term hoover in some countries
  - Also an idiomatic verb named after the vacuum cleaner, meaning to suck in or inhale
- D&B Hoovers, a business information company based in Austin, Texas, US
- Hoover (film), a 2000 American drama film
- Hoover (seal), a harbor seal that learned to imitate basic human speech
- Hoover index, Edgar Malone Hoover's inequality measure
- Lockheed S-3 Viking, nicknamed Hoover
- Operation Hoover
- Hoover Institution, a public-policy think tank at Stanford University founded by Herbert Hoover, later US president
- Hoover League, created by the Republican Party to campaign for the re-election of U.S. president Herbert Hoover

== See also ==
- Hoover Building, in London, England originally a Hoover Company factory
- Hoover House (disambiguation)
- Hover (disambiguation)
- Huber, a German surname (Anglicized form is Hoover)
