= Hover =

Hover or Hovering may refer to:

- Levitation (physics), the process by which an object or person is suspended by a physical force against gravitation without solid physical contact

== Animal behaviour ==
- Hover (behaviour), to remain stationary or float in the air, exhibited by some winged animals
- Hovering, a swimming mode in the metachronal swimming of Antarctic krill

== Computing ==
- Hover (domain registrar)
- Mouse hover or mouseover, a gesture made with the pointer in computer user interfaces

== Transport ==
- Hover (helicopter), nearly stationary flight in a helicopter
- Hovercraft, vehicles capable of traveling and being stationary over land, water, mud or ice
- Hovertrain, a type of high-speed train
- Great Wall Hover, a Sport utility vehicle produced by Great Wall Motors
- Johan E. Høver, a Norwegian aircraft designer, most noted for the Høver M.F. 11

== Other uses ==
- Hover (EP), a 2005 EP by Hair Peace Salon
- Hover (film), a 2018 American science fiction film
- Hover Chamber Choir, an Armenian choir
- Hover!, a computer game for Microsoft Windows
- A partial squatting position often used by women to urinate without sitting

== See also ==
- Hoover (disambiguation)
- Windhover (disambiguation), various meanings including the Common Kestrel
