= Pentacolossendeis =

Scientific classification
- Kingdom: Animalia
- Phylum: Arthropoda
- Subphylum: Chelicerata
- Class: Pycnogonida
- Order: Pantopoda
- Family: Colossendeidae
- Genus: Pentacolossendeis; Hedgpeth, 1943
- Species: P. reticulata

Binomial name
- Pentacolossendeis reticulata Hedgpeth, 1943

Genus of sea spiders

Pentacolossendeis is a monotypic genus of sea spider (class Pycnogonida) in the family Colossendeidae. The only species in this genus is Pentacolossendeis reticulata. As the name of this genus suggests, this genus is among the four genera of sea spiders with five pairs of legs in adults instead of the usual four leg pairs. The species P. reticulata has a Caribbean distribution and is one of only two species of polymerous (i.e., extra-legged) sea spiders found outside the Southern Ocean.

== Discovery ==
This genus and its only species were first described in 1943 by the American biologist Joel W. Hedgpeth. He based the original description of this genus and this species on five female specimens, including the holotype and three paratypes. The American marine biologist William Stimpson collected the first specimen in 1872 at a depth of 104 fathoms off Sand Key in Florida. This paratype is deposited in the Museum of Comparative Zoology at Harvard University. Hedgpeth found the other four specimens, all collected near Key West in Florida, in the collections of the National Museum of Natural History in Washington, D.C. One specimen was collected in 1893 by the University of Iowa expedition at a depth of 110 fathoms near American Shoal Light in Florida. The other three, including the holotype and two paratypes, were collected in 1902 at a depth of 98 fathoms near Key West.

== Description ==
The adult in this species features five pairs of legs that are long and slender. For example, Hedgpeth describes a specimen in which the fourth leg measures 27.5 mm in length, including a blunt terminal claw, whereas the trunk measures only 3.5 mm in length, and the proboscis measures 3.1 mm in length. The palps feature nine segments, and the ovigers feature ten segments and a scoop-shaped terminal claw.

The trunk is cylindrical, elongated, and completely segmented, with lateral processes that are separated by spaces about as wide as their own diameters. The ocular tubercle is rounded and only slightly higher than wide, with eyes that are large and lightly pigmented. The proboscis is slightly curved, larger at the tip, and delicately reticulated. The surfaces of the trunk and legs feature less conspicuous reticulation. The abdomen is very small, blunt, and conical. Genital pores appear on some or all of the second coxae of the legs, but these pores are very obscure.

This sea spider exhibits traits shared with others in the family Colossendeidae. For example, like others in this family, this sea spider features an ocular tubercle, ovigers with ten segments, and legs that are more than five times as long as the trunk. Furthermore, like others in this family, this sea spider features a proboscis longer than three-quarters the length of the trunk.

This sea spider shares a more extensive set of traits with its eight-legged relatives in the genus Colossendeis, where this species would be placed but for the presence of a fifth pair of legs. Like the sea spiders in Colossendeis, for example, those in Pentacolossendeis feature a low ocular tubercle, clearly separated lateral processes, and tiny genital pores. Furthermore, chelifores are absent in adults in both of these genera.

The sea spiders in Pentacolossendeis can be distinguished from those in Colossendeis, however, not only by the number of legs but also by the segmentation of the trunk. In Colossendeis, the trunk segments are fused, so that the surface of the trunk is smooth with no ridges. In Pentacolossendeis, however, the trunk is completely segmented by sutures with annular swellings.

The genus Decolopoda is the only other genus in the family Colossendeidae with five leg pairs. Like the sea spiders in Pentacolossendeis, those in Decolopoda are otherwise similar to their relatives in Colessendeis. The sea spiders in Pentacolossendeis can be distinguished from those in Decolopoda, however, based on traits other than the number of legs. For example, chelifores are absent in adults in Pentacolossendeis but present and well developed in adults in Decolopoda. Furthermore, the trunk segments are fused in Decolopoda, whereas the trunk is completely segmented in Pentacolossendeis.

== Distribution ==
This sea spider is found in the Caribbean Sea, in the Gulf of Mexico, and in the tropical northwestern Atlantic Ocean. The range of P. reticulata extends from Florida and the Bahamas to Guyana. This sea spider has been recorded at depths from 135 to 1,298 meters below the surface.
