= List of sea spiders of South Africa =

List of saltwater species that form a part of the pycnogonid fauna of South Africa

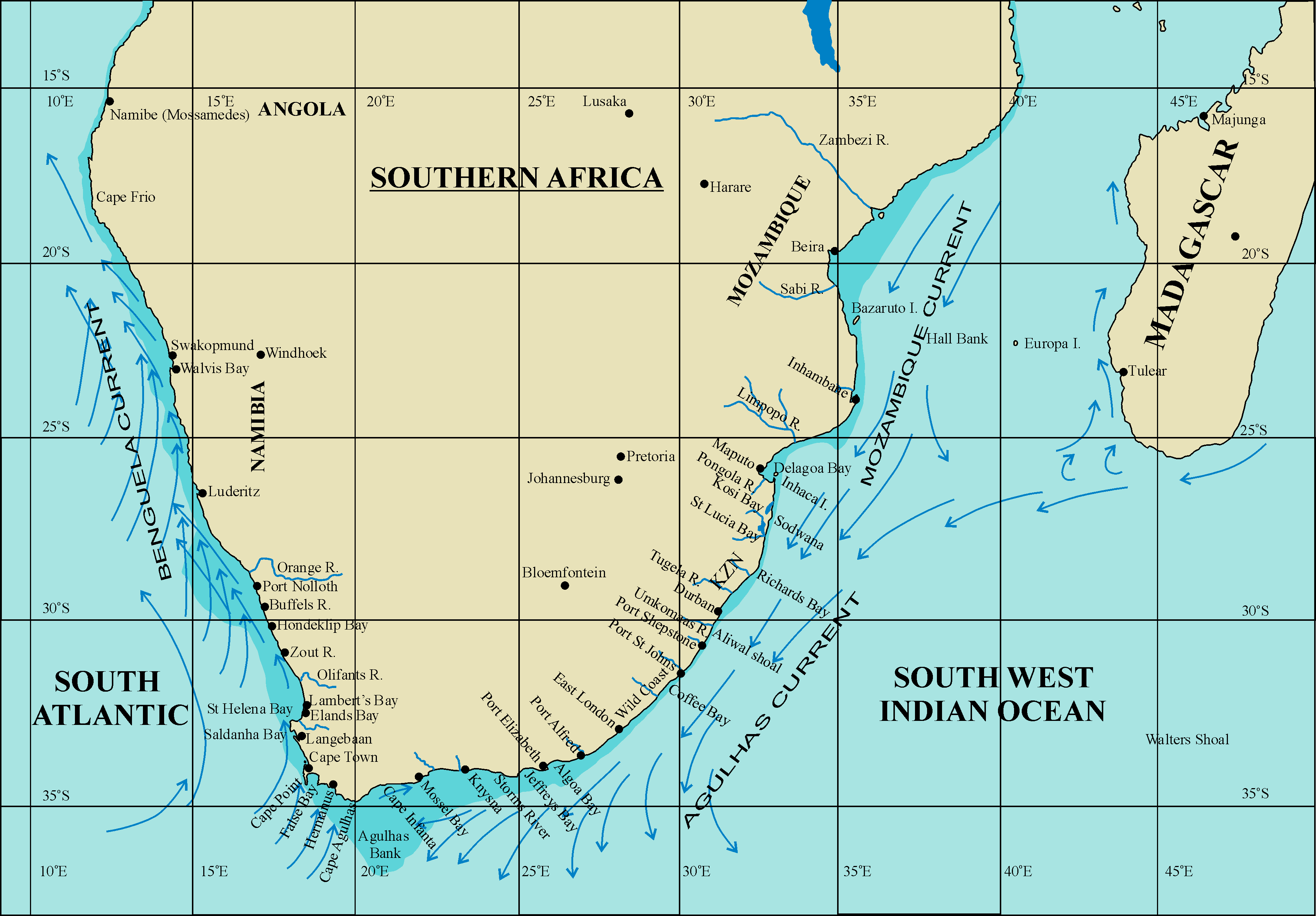
Map of the Southern African coastline showing some of the landmarks referred to in species range statements

The list of sea spiders of South Africa is a list of species that form a part of the pycnogonid (Class Pycnogonida) fauna of South Africa. The list follows the SANBI listing on iNaturalist, and does not always agree with WoRMS for distribution.

Sea spiders are marine arthropods of the class Pycnogonida, hence they are also called pycnogonids (/pɪkˈnɒɡənədz/; named after Pycnogonum, the type genus; with the suffix -id). The class includes the only extant order Pantopoda (lit. 'all feet'), alongside a few fossil species which could trace back to the early or mid-Paleozoic.

They are cosmopolitan, found in oceans around the world. The over 1,300 known species have leg spans ranging from 1 mm (0.04 in) to over 70 cm (2.3 ft). Most are toward the smaller end of this range in relatively shallow depths; however, they can grow to be quite large in the Antarctic region and in deep waters.

Despite their name and slight resemblance, "sea spiders" are not spiders, nor even arachnids. While some literature around the 2000s suggests they may be a sister group to all other living arthropods, their traditional classification as a member of chelicerates alongside horseshoe crabs and arachnids has regained wide support in subsequent studies. (Full article...)

== Order Pantopoda ==
=== Suborder Eupantopodida ===
==== Superfamily Ascorhynchoidea ====
===== Family Ammotheidae =====
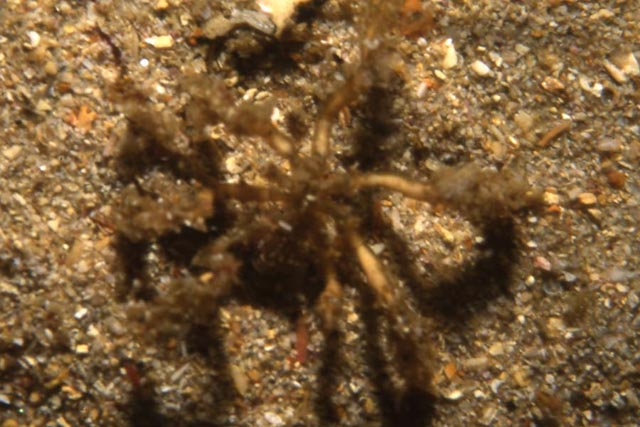
Tanystylum brevipes

- Achelia barnardi Stock, 1959 – endemic
- Achelia brevicauda (Loman, 1904) – endemic
- Achelia nana (Loman, 1908)
- Achelia quadridentata (Hodgson, 1910)
- Ammothella indica Stock, 1954
- Ammothella setacea (Helfer, 1938) – endemic
- Cilunculus bifidus (Stock, 1968) – endemic
- Cilunculus sewelli Calman, 1938
- Nymphopsis cuspidata Hodgson, 1910 – endemic
- Nymphopsis varipes Stock, 1962 – endemic
- Tanystylum brevipes (Hoek, 1881)
- Tanystylum ornatum Flynn, 1928
- Tanystylum thermophilum Barnard, 1946 – endemic

===== Family Ascorhynchidae =====
- Ascorhynchus breviscapus Stock, 1968
- Ascorhynchus inflatus Stock, 1963
- Ascorhynchus ornatus (Helfer, 1938)
- Boehmia chelata (Bohm, 1879) – endemic
- Boehmia longirostris Stock, 1957 – endemic
- Boehmia tuberosa Möbius, 1902 – endemic
- Nymphonella lambertensis Stock, 1959

===== Superfamily Ascorhynchoidea family incertae sedis =====
- Hannonia spinipes Stock, 1956 – endemic
- Hannonia typica Hoek, 1881
- Queubus jamesanus Barnard, 1946 – endemic

==== Superfamily Colossendeidoidea ====
===== Family Colossendeidae =====
====== Subfamily Colossendeinae ======
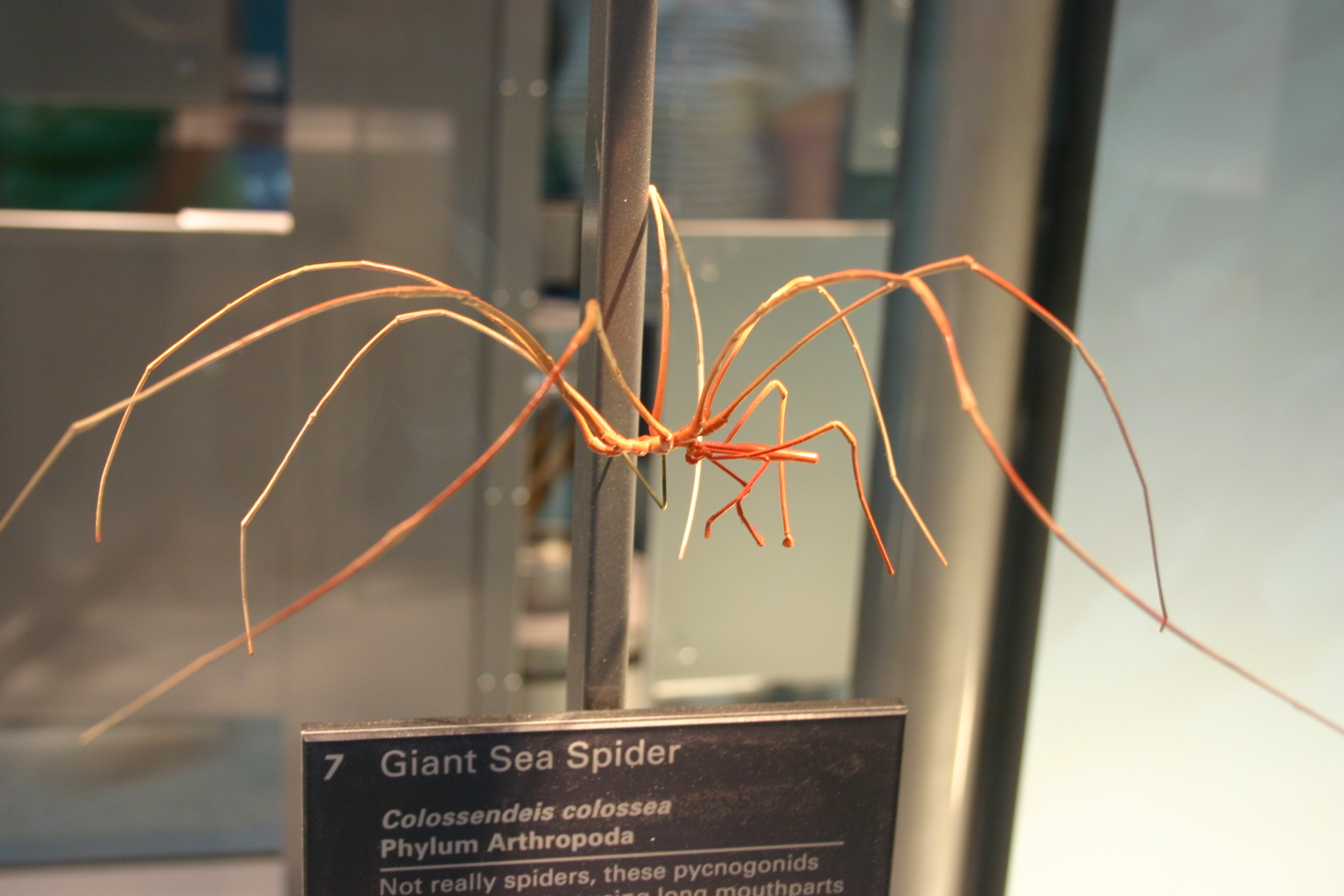
Colossendeis colossea Smithsonian Natural History Museum

- Colossendeis angusta Sars, 1877
- Colossendeis colossea Wilson, 1881
- Colossendeis curtirostris Stock, 1963 – endemic
- Colossendeis macerrima Wilson, 1881
- Colossendeis megalonyx Hoek, 1881
- Colossendeis minuta Hoek, 1881
- Colossendeis oculifera Stock, 1963 – endemic

====== Subfamily Hedgpethiinae ======
- Hedgpethia magnirostris Arnaud & Child, 1988 – endemic
- Rhopalorhynchus gracillimus Carpenter, 1907
- Rhopalorhynchus kroeyeri Wood-Mason, 1873

=== Suborder Stiripasterida ===
==== Family Austrodecidae ====
- Pantopipetta armata Arnaud & Child, 1988 – endemic
- Pantopipetta auxiliata Stock, 1968
- Pantopipetta bilobata Arnaud & Child, 1988 – endemic
- Pantopipetta capensis (Barnard, 1946) – endemic
- Pantopipetta longituberculata (Turpaeva, 1955)

==== Superfamily Nymphonoidea ====
===== Family Callipallenidae =====
- Callipallene africana Arnaud & Child, 1988 – endemic
- Callipallene phantoma (Dohrn, 1881)
- Callipallene vexator Stock, 1956 – endemic
- Pallenoides proboscidea Barnard, 1955 – endemic
- Parapallene algoae Barnard, 1946 – endemic
- Parapallene calmani Flynn, 1928 – endemic
- Parapallene hodgsoni Barnard, 1946
- Parapallene invertichelata Arnaud & Child, 1988 – endemic
- Parapallene longipes Calman, 1938
- Parapallene nierstraszi Loman, 1908
- Parapallene spinosa (Möbius, 1902)
- Propallene crassimanus Stock, 1959
- Propallene dubitans (Hodgson, 1910) – endemic
- Propallene magnicollis Stock, 1951 – endemic
- Propallene similis Barnard, 1955
- Pseudopallene gilchristi Flynn, 1928 (taxon inquirendum Feb 2019)
- Safropallene longimana Arnaud & Child, 1988 – endemic

===== Family Nymphonidae =====
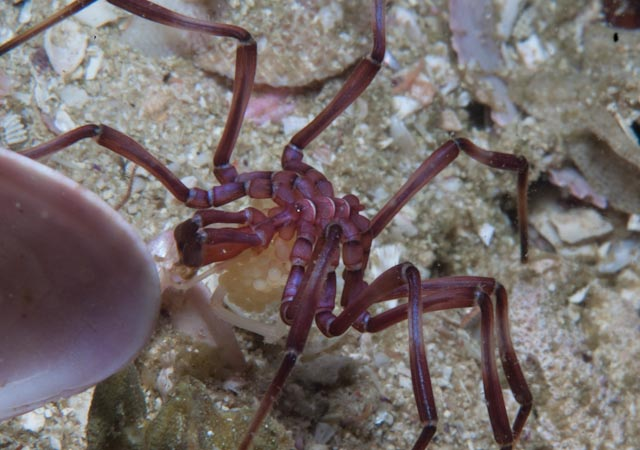
Nymphon signatum with eggs

- Nymphon australe Hodgson, 1902
- Nymphon barnardi Arnaud & Child, 1988 – endemic
- Nymphon bicornum Arnaud & Child, 1988 – endemic
- Nymphon comes Flynn, 1928 – endemic
- Nymphon crenatiunguis Barnard, 1946 – endemic
- Nymphon distensum Möbius, 1902 – endemic
- Nymphon granulatum Arnaud & Child, 1988 – endemic
- Nymphon laterospinum Stock, 1963
- Nymphon lobatum Stock, 1962 – endemic
- Nymphon microctenatum Barnard, 1946 – endemic
- Nymphon modestum Stock, 1959 – endemic
- Nymphon natalense Flynn, 1928 – endemic
- Nymphon obesum Arnaud & Child, 1988 – endemic
- Nymphon paralobatum Arnaud & Child, 1988 – endemic
- Nymphon pedunculatum Arnaud & Child, 1988 – endemic
- Nymphon phasmatoides Bohm, 1879 – endemic
- Nymphon pilosum Möbius, 1902 – endemic
- Nymphon pleodon Stock, 1962 – endemic
- Nymphon serratidentatum Arnaud & Child, 1988 – endemic
- Nymphon setimanus Barnard, 1946 – endemic
- Nymphon signatum Möbius, 1902 – endemic

===== Family Pallenopsidae =====
- Bathypallenopsis californica (Schimkewitsch, 1893)
- Bathypallenopsis longirostris (Wilson, 1881)
- Pallenopsis brevidigitata Möbius, 1902
- Pallenopsis capensis Barnard, 1946 – endemic
- Pallenopsis crosslandi Carpenter, 1910
- Pallenopsis intermedia Flynn, 1928
- Pallenopsis ovalis Loman, 1908
- Pallenopsis persimillis Stock, 1956

==== Superfamily Phoxichilidoidea ====
===== Family Endeidae, subfamily Endeinae =====
- Endeis clipeata Möbius, 1902
- Endeis mollis (Carpenter, 1904)

===== Family Phoxichilidiidae =====
- Anoplodactylus aculeatus Möbius, 1902 – endemic
- Anoplodactylus capensis(Flynn, 1928) – endemic
- Anoplodactylus lappa(Böhm, 1879) – nomen dubium
- Anoplodactylus typhlops Sars, 1888
- Anoplodactylus unilobus Stock, 1959 – endemic

==== Superfamily Pycnogonoidea ====
===== Family Pycnogonidae =====
- Pycnogonum (Nulloviger) africanum Calman, 1938
- Pycnogonum angulirostrum Stock, 1959 – endemic
- Pycnogonum cataphractum Möbius, 1902 – endemic
- Pycnogonum crassirostrum Sars, 1888
- Pycnogonum forte Flynn, 1928 – endemic
- Pycnogonum microps Loman 1904 – endemic
- Pycnogonum nodulosum Dohrn, 1881
- Pycnogonum portus Barnard, 1946 – endemic
- Pycnogonum (Retroviger) pusillum Dohrn, 1881
