= Hoover House =

Hoover House may refer to:

== Australia ==
- Hoover House, a home of President Herbert Hoover in Gwalia, Western Australia

== Canada ==
- Christian K. Hoover House, a historic house museum in Markham, Ontario
- Hoover House, a historic building in Toronto, Ontario

== United States ==
- Lou Henry Hoover House, a home of President Herbert Hoover in Stanford, California
- Eli Hoover House and Confectionary, Muncie, Indiana, listed on the National Register of Historic Places
- Herbert Hoover National Historic Site, West Branch, Iowa
- Hoover House (Nicholasville, Kentucky), listed on the National Register of Historic Places in Jessamine County, Kentucky
- Shuford–Hoover House, Blackburn, North Carolina, listed on the National Register of Historic Places
- Barnet–Hoover Log House, Green Township, Ohio, listed on the National Register of Historic Places in Wayne County, Ohio
- Thomas Benton Hoover House, a historic house in Fossil, Oregon
- Hoover–Minthorn House, a childhood home of President Herbert Hoover in Newberg, Oregon
- Alexander Hoover House, Hoover, South Dakota, listed on the National Register of Historic Places
- Hoover House, a historic house in Hoover, Alabama
- Hoover House, a landmark house in Riverside, California
- Hoover House, a residence hall at the University of Chicago
