= Herbert Hoover (disambiguation) =

Herbert Hoover (1874–1964) was the 31st president of the United States from 1929 to 1933.

Herbert Hoover may also refer to:

- Herbert Hoover Jr. (1903–1969), Herbert Hoover's son and an engineer, businessman, and politician
- M. Herbert Hoover (1891–1952), Ohio politician
- Herb Hoover (1912–1952), American test pilot

== See also ==
- SS President Hoover, an American ocean liner
- Hoover High School (disambiguation), high schools named after Herbert Hoover
