= Hooveria =

Hooveria may refer to:

- Hooveria, a genus of perennial bulbous plants native to North America.
- 932 Hooveria, a minor planet.

== See also ==
- Hoover (surname)
