= Dorothy Hoover =

Dorothy Hoover may refer to:

- Dorothy Haines Hoover (1904–1995), Canadian painter
- Dorothy McFadden Hoover (1918–2000), American physicist and mathematician
