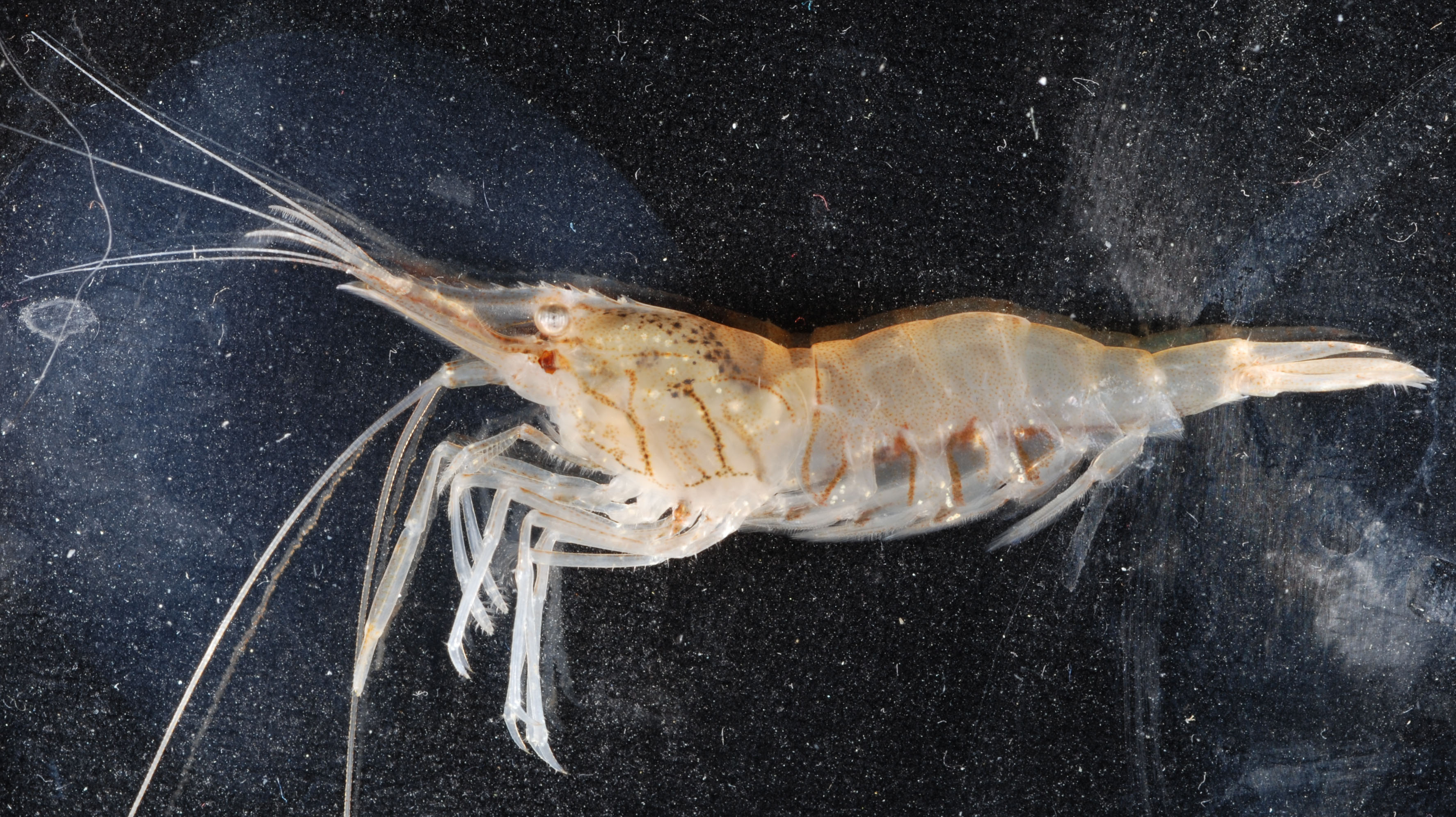

Scientific classification
- Domain: Eukaryota
- Kingdom: Animalia
- Phylum: Arthropoda
- Class: Malacostraca
- Order: Decapoda
- Suborder: Pleocyemata
- Infraorder: Caridea
- Family: Palaemonidae
- Genus: Palaemon
- Species: P. vulgaris

Binomial name
- Palaemon vulgaris Say, 1818

Synonyms
- Palaemon vulgaris (Say, 1818); Palaemonetes carolinus Stimpson, 1871; Palaemon carolinus (Stimpson, 1871); Palaeomonopsis carolinus (Stimpson, 1871)

= Palaemon vulgaris =

Species of crustacean

Palaemon vulgaris, variously known as the common American prawn, common grass shrimp, marsh grass shrimp or marsh shrimp, is a common species of shrimp in the western Atlantic Ocean from Cape Cod Bay to the Gulf of Mexico. Adults grow to less than 5 cm (2.0 in) long, and are transparent except for some orange pigmentation on the eyestalks.

== Hydrodynamics ==
Marsh grass shrimp have been investigated for their maneuverability and swimming. These shrimp swim metachronally, creating an appendage wave, starting with the pleopod closest to the tail, beating all of their appendages with a phase lag. They also modulate the profile area of their appendages to create net thrust.

Through Particle Image Velocimetry, two drag-reducing mechanisms have been identified in marsh shrimp swimming that enable them to reduce drag during the return stroke of their beat. The first of those mechanisms is asymmetric flexibility, with the appendages staying mostly rigid during the power stroke and being flexible during the return stroke, this results in a reduced wake. The second of those mechanisms is grouping of the appendages.
