= HHHS =

HHHS may refer to:

Lebanon

- Houssam Hariri High School, in Sharhabil, Saida

Australia

- Hunters Hill High School, in Sydney, New South Wales

South Africa

- Hottentots Holland High School, in Western Cape

United States

- Hasbrouck Heights High School in New Jersey
- Haddon Heights High School, in New Jersey
- Hamilton Heights High School, in Arcadia, Indiana
- Hatboro-Horsham Senior High School, in Horsham, Pennsylvania
- Hendrick Hudson High School in Montrose, New York
- Heritage Hills High School, in Lincoln City, Indiana
- Herbert Hoover High School (disambiguation)
- Houston Heights High School, in Houston, Texas
- Hunter Huss High School, in Gastonia, North Carolina
