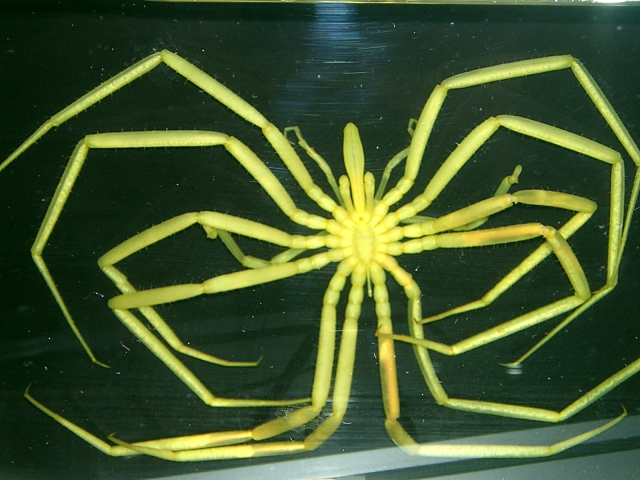
- Image of Dodecolopoda mawsoni

Scientific classification
- Kingdom: Animalia
- Phylum: Arthropoda
- Subphylum: Chelicerata
- Class: Pycnogonida
- Order: Pantopoda
- Family: Colossendeidae
- Genus: Dodecolopoda; Calman & Gordon, 1933
- Species: D. mawsoni

Binomial name
- Dodecolopoda mawsoni Calman & Gordon, 1933

= Dodecolopoda =

Genus of sea spiders

Dodecolopoda is a monotypic genus of sea spider (class Pycnogonida) in the family Colossendeidae. The only species in this genus is Dodecolopoda mawsoni. This species is notable as one of only two species of sea spider with six pairs of legs in adults (instead of the usual four leg pairs) and the first such species to be discovered.

== Discovery ==
This species was first described by the Scottish zoologists William Thomas Calman and Isabella Gordon of the British Museum (Natural History) in 1933. The original description is based on a male holotype found at a depth of 219 meters below the surface off the coast of MacRobertson Land. Calman and Gordon named this species for Sir Douglas Mawson, who obtained this specimen on his voyage to the Antarctic region in 1931.

== Phylogeny ==
Phylogenetic analysis based on molecular data places Dodecolopoda in a clade with the ten-legged sea spiders in the genus Decolopoda, which emerge as the closest relatives of Dodecolopoda. This analysis also indicates that both Dodecolopoda and Decolopoda are nested within the eight-legged genus Colossendeis in a phylogenetic tree. Thus, Colossendeis is paraphyletic with respect to these two polymerous (i.e., extra-legged) genera. This paraphyly would normally make both Dodecolopoda and Colossendeis junior synonyms of Decolopoda, the oldest name, and require all three genera to merge under the name Decolopoda. To avoid this disruption, authorities keep these genera under different names and retain Colossendeis as a paraphyletic genus.

The molecular evidence also indicates that the polymerous clade including Dodecolopoda and Decolopoda is nested within a monophyletic group containing the "longitarsal" species in the genus Colossendeis. The sea spiders in this "longitarsal" clade feature legs in which the three most distal articles (claw, propodus, and tarsus) taken together are at least three-quarters the length of the fourth most distal article (second tibia). In "brevitarsal" species of Colossendeis, the three distal articles are instead much shorter relative to the second tibia.

== Description ==
The species Dodecolopoda mawsoni is notable for not only its twelve legs but also its gigantic size. The holotype, for example, measures 20 inches (510 mm) from tip to tip of its legs when fully extended. These legs are about the same length except for the first pair, which are shorter than the others. The leg of the fourth pair on the holotype measures 240.3 millimeters (9.46 in) long. The ventral surface of the second most proximal article (second coxa) of each leg features a minute genital pore. The sea spider's long legs act as stilts, holding its body well above the seabed surface below. This species is the only sea spider to combine giant size with six pairs of legs, as the only other species with twelve legs (Sexanymphon mirabilis) is small.

The polymerous genera Dodecolopoda and Decolopoda both resemble their eight-legged relatives in the genus Colossendeis. All three genera feature long legs and a long proboscis, traits that place them in the same family. The proboscis of the Dodecolopoda holotype, for example, is 1.75 times as long as the trunk. Furthermore, Dodecolopoda exhibits some traits considered diagnostic for the genus Colessendeis, such as an unsegmented trunk and tiny genital pores. The genus Dodecolopoda also features longitarsal legs, like those found in its closest relatives in the genus Colessendeis: The three most distal articles of a representative leg on the Dodecolopoda holotype, for example, taken together are longer than the second tibia.

The polymerous genera Dodecolopoda and Decolopoda both differ from their close relatives in the genus Colessendeis not only by featuring more legs but also by retaining chelifores as adults. Adults in the genus Colessendeis lack chelifores. Furthermore, both Dodecolopoda and Decolopoda feature unusual chelae on their chelifores in that the dorsal finger moves while the ventral finger is immobile; in the chelifores of all other sea spiders, the ventral finger moves, and the dorsal finger is immobile.

The closely related genera Dodecolopoda and Decolopoda share other distinctive traits. For example, both genera feature a long proboscis that curves downward and is distally inflated. Furthermore, both genera feature legs in which the third most distal article (tarsus) is much longer than the second most distal article (propodus).

The sea spiders in Dodecolopoda not only have more legs, however, but also are larger than the species in Decolopoda. Furthermore, in Dodecolopoda, the most distal leg article (claw) is shorter relative to the propodus, and the propodus is shorter relative to the tarsus, compared to the corresponding articles in Decolopoda. In a representative leg of Dodecolopoda, for example, the claw is less than half as long as the propodus, which is less than half as long as the tarsus.

== Locomotion ==
While walking, Dodecolopoda moves its legs in a metachronal pattern, with the movements of each leg lasting for a nearly equal amount of time and these strokes moving in regular waves along the body. This sea spider, like its close relatives in the genus Decolopoda, uses all of its legs in walking with a metachronal rhythm. These polymerous species walk with more coordination and precision than eight-legged sea spiders, which use a more casual gait. Octopodous sea spiders with long legs exhibit a more imprecise gait, lifting some legs or letting them drag while other legs take steps for several cycles, with strokes of irregular duration and legs sometimes overlapping or tangling with each other.

== Distribution ==
Sea spiders in the genus Dodecolopoda are found in the Indian and Atlantic regions of the Southern Ocean and are endemic to the Antarctic region. Specimens have been found off the South Shetland Islands, the Palmer Archipelago, and Enderby Land, as well as in the Ross Sea, caught at depths ranging from 146 to 549 meters below the surface. The distribution of this genus is circumpolar in the Antarctic zone.
