= Hoover (surname) =

Hoover is the Anglicized version of the German and Dutch surname Huber, originally designating a landowner or a prosperous small farmer. Notable people with the surname include:

- Alice Hoover (1928–2014), All-American Girls Professional Baseball League player
- Andrea Hoover (born 1992), American basketball player
- Bob Hoover (1922–2016), airshow and test pilot, author
- Brad Hoover (born 1976), American football fullback
- Charles Franklin Hoover (1865–1927), American physician
- Colleen Hoover (born 1979), American author
- Dave Hoover (1955–2011), American comic book artist and animator
- Dave Hoover (American football), American football coach
- Dick Hoover (baseball) (1925–1981), American Major League Baseball player
- Dick Hoover (1929–2009), American professional bowler
- Dorothy Haines Hoover (1904–1995), Canadian artist
- Erna Schneider Hoover (born 1926), inventor of the computerized telephone switching system
- Helen Hoover, American nature writer
- Herbert Hoover (1874–1964), 31st president of the United States
- Herbert Hoover Jr. (1903–1969), the son of President Herbert Hoover; a successful engineer and businessman
- Herb Hoover (1912–1952), American test pilot
- J. Edgar Hoover (1895–1972), longest-serving head of the Federal Bureau of Investigation
- John Hoover (baseball) (1962–2014), American Major League Baseball pitcher
- John H. Hoover (1887–1970), U.S. Navy Admiral who served in World War II
- Josh Hoover (born 2003), American football player
- Katherine Hoover (1937–2018), US composer and flutist
- Lamar Hoover (1887–1944), American college sports coach
- Larry Hoover (born 1950), leader of the Gangster Disciples street gang
- Lou Henry Hoover (1874–1944), wife of President Herbert Hoover
- M. Herbert Hoover (died 1952), American politician (who is not related to the 31st president of the United States)
- Mary Cunningham Hoover (1928 - 2020), American athlete
- Margaret Hoover (born 1977), American political consultant and commentator, great-granddaughter of the former president
- Natalie Hoover (born 1989), voice actress
- Nathan Hoover (born 1997), American basketball player
- Paul Hoover (poet) (born 1946), American poet
- Paul Hoover (baseball) (born 1976), American Major League Baseball catcher
- Robert Francis Hoover (1913–1970), botanist; see Brodiaea appendiculata
- William Henry "Boss" Hoover (1849–1932), founder of The Hoover Company

== Characters ==
- Robert Hoover, from the movie Animal House
- Elizabeth Hoover (Miss Hoover), fictional school teacher from the US TV series The Simpsons; See List of recurring The Simpsons characters
- Walter Hoover, in James Curtis's novel They Drive by Night
  - Walter Hoover, played by Ernest Thesiger in the film adaptation They Drive by Night
- Dwayne Hoover, in Kurt Vonnegut's novel Breakfast of Champions
- Bertolt Hoover (also spelled as Bertholdt Hoover), in Hajime Isayama's Manga/Anime Attack on Titan
- Hoover, an agent of the Grail in Garth Ennis and Steve Dillon's comic series Preacher

== See also ==
- Hoover (disambiguation)
