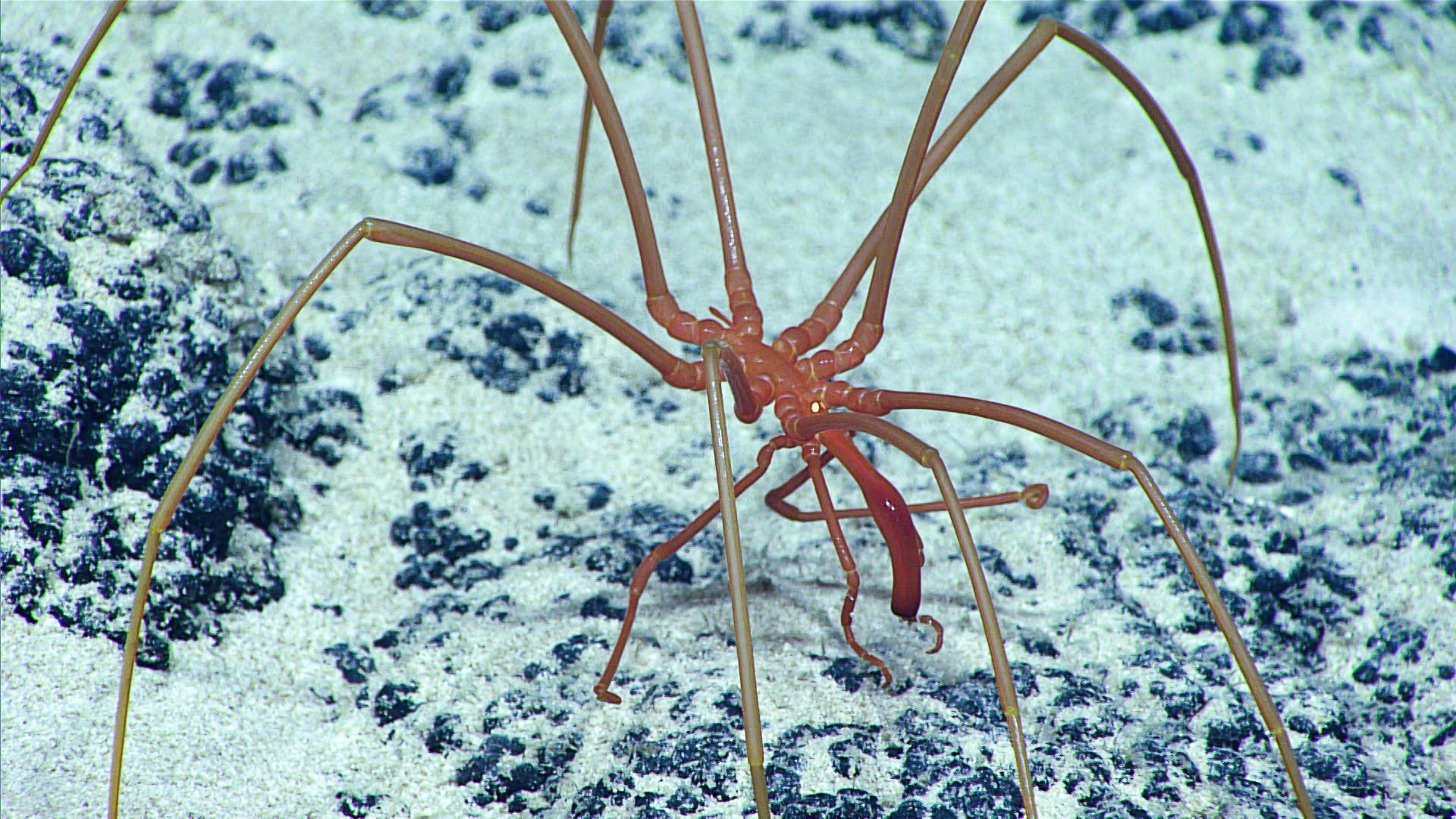

Scientific classification
- Kingdom: Animalia
- Phylum: Arthropoda
- Subphylum: Chelicerata
- Class: Pycnogonida
- Order: Pantopoda
- Family: Colossendeidae; Jarzynsky, 1870

Genera
- Colossendeis; Decolopoda; Dodecolopoda; Hedgpethia; Pentacolossendeis; Rhopalorhynchus

Diversity
- 6 genera

= Colossendeidae =

Colossendeidae Temporal range: Jurassic–present

Family of sea spiders

Colossendeidae is a family of sea spiders (class Pycnogonida). This family includes more than 100 species distributed among six genera. These sea spiders inhabit the deep sea mostly but are also found in shallower waters, especially in Antarctic and Arctic waters.

== Description ==
Most colossendeids can grow to giant sizes as adults, far larger than any other sea spiders. The largest sea spider, Colossendeis colossea, can reach a leg span of 70 cm, whereas the subfamily Hedgpethiinae includes tiny species with leg span of less than 1 cm. Like most sea spiders, colossendeids usually have four pairs of legs in adults, except for three species, Decolopoda australis, D. qasimi, and Pentacolossendeis reticulata, with five leg pairs, and one species, Dodecolopoda mawsoni, with six leg pairs.

Colossendeids typically have no chelifores, except in the extra-legged species which have robust pincers and 2-segmented scapes. The palps and ovigers are present in both males and females, they are elongated with basal processes located very close to each other. The palps have 8 or 9 segments (historically 9 or 10 as the basal process was once thought to be a segment) while the ovigers have 10 segments. Each oviger ends in a strong terminal claw and compound spines arranged in fields or rows on a well formed strigilis (hook-like distal segments). The proboscis is long, usually longer than the body. The body and legs are usually glabrous. The trunk segments are either segmented (Hedgpethiinae) or fused (Colossendeinae). The legs are very long, and the terminal main claws have no auxiliary claws. gonopores represented on some or all legs.

== Taxonomy ==
- Colossendeinae Jarzynsky, 1870
  - Colossendeis Jarzinsky, 1870 (67 species)
    - Colossendeis acuta Stiboy-Risch, 1993
    - Colossendeis adelpha Child, 1998
    - Colossendeis angusta Sars, 1877
    - Colossendeis aperta Turpaeva, 2005
    - Colossendeis arcuata A. Milne-Edwards, 1885
    - Colossendeis australis Hodgson, 1907
    - Colossendeis avida Pushkin, 1970
    - Colossendeis belekurovi Pushkin, 1993
    - Colossendeis bicincta Schimkewitsch, 1893
    - Colossendeis brevirostris Child, 1995
    - Colossendeis bruuni Fage, 1956
    - Colossendeis clavata Meinert, 1899
    - Colossendeis colossea Wilson, 1881
    - Colossendeis concedis Child, 1995
    - Colossendeis cucurbita Cole, 1909
    - Colossendeis curtirostris Stock, 1963
    - Colossendeis dalli Child, 1995
    - Colossendeis drakei Calman, 1915
    - Colossendeis elephantis Child, 1995
    - Colossendeis enigmatica Turpaeva, 1974
    - Colossendeis ensifer Child, 1995
    - Colossendeis fijigrypos Bamber, 2004
    - Colossendeis fragilis Pushkin, 1993
    - Colossendeis gardineri Carpenter, 1907
    - Colossendeis geoffroyi Mane-Garzon, 1944
    - Colossendeis gibbosa Mobius, 1902
    - Colossendeis glacialis Hodgson, 1907
    - Colossendeis gracilis Hoek, 1881
    - Colossendeis grassa Pushkin, 1993
    - Colossendeis hoeki Gordon, 1944
    - Colossendeis insolita Pushkin, 1993
    - Colossendeis japonica Hoek, 1898
    - Colossendeis korotkevitschi Pushkin, 1984
    - Colossendeis kurtchatovi Turpaeva, 1993
    - Colossendeis leninensis Pushkin, 1993
    - Colossendeis leptorhynchus Hoek, 1881
    - Colossendeis longirostris Gordon, 1938
    - Colossendeis losinskii Turpaeva, 2002
    - Colossendeis macerrima Wilson, 1881
    - Colossendeis media Hoek, 1881
    - Colossendeis megalonyx Fry & Hedgpeth, 1969
    - Colossendeis melancholicus Stock, 1975
    - Colossendeis mica Pushkin, 1970
    - Colossendeis microsetosa Hilton, 1943
    - Colossendeis minor Schimkewitsch, 1893
    - Colossendeis minuta Hoek, 1881
    - Colossendeis mycterismos Bamber, 2004
    - Colossendeis nasuta Hedgpeth, 1949
    - Colossendeis notialis Child 1995
    - Colossendeis oculifera Stock, 1963
    - Colossendeis peloria Child, 1994
    - Colossendeis perforata Turpaeva, 1993
    - Colossendeis pipetta Stock, 1991
    - Colossendeis proboscidea (Sabine)
    - Colossendeis robusta Hoek, 1881
    - Colossendeis rostrata Turpaeva, 1994
    - Colossendeis scoresbii Gordon, 1932
    - Colossendeis scotti Calman, 1915
    - Colossendeis sinuosa Stock, 1997
    - Colossendeis spicula Child, 1994
    - Colossendeis stramenti Fry and Hedgpeth, 1969
    - Colossendeis subminuta Schimkewitsch, 1893
    - Colossendeis tenera Hilton, 1943
    - Colossendeis tenuipedis Pushkin, 1993
    - Colossendeis tethya Turpaeva, 1974
    - Colossendeis tortipalpis Gordon, 1932
    - Colossendeis vityazi Turpaeva, 1973
    - Colossendeis wilsoni Calman, 1915
  - Decolopoda Eights, 1835
    - Decolopoda australis Eights, 1835
    - Decolopoda quasimi Sree, Sreepada & Parulekar, 1993
  - Dodecolopoda Calman & Gordon, 1933
    - Dodecolopoda mawsoni Calman & Gordon, 1933
  - Pentacolossendeis Hedgpeth, 1943
    - Pentacolossendeis reticulata Hedgpeth, 1943
- Hedgpethiinae Pushkin, 1990
  - Hedgpethia Turpaeva, 1973 (12 species)
  - Rhopalorhynchus
    - Rhopalorhynchus cinclus Bamber, 2001 — Bodgaya Southern Rim Reef, Malaysia (on a sponge)
    - Rhopalorhynchus claudus Stock, 1975 — Barbados (muddy sand, shell debris, sponge bottom)
    - Rhopalorhynchus clavipes Carpenter, 1893 — Torres Strait (between reefs)
    - Rhopalorhynchus filipes Stock, 1991 — between Loyalty Islands and New Caledonia, near Chesterfield Island
    - Rhopalorhynchus gracillimus Carpenter, 1907 — Maldive Islands (on a black crinoid)
    - Rhopalorhynchus kroeyeri Wood-Mason, 1873 — Andaman Islands (on the bottom of filamentous algae)
    - Rhopalorhynchus lomani Stock, 1958 — Makassar Strait, Indonesia
    - Rhopalorhynchus mortenseni Stock, 1958 — off Jolo, Sulu Archipelago (on sand and corals)
    - Rhopalorhynchus pedunculatum Stock, 1957 — Red Sea (shore)
    - Rhopalorhynchus sibogae Stock, 1958 — Flores Sea, Indonesia (on mud and sand)
    - Rhopalorhynchus tenuissimus Haswell, 1884 — Port Denison, Australia

Colossendeis has been known to be paraphyletic with respects to Decolopoda and Dodecolopoda; both these genera nest within a "longitarsal clade" (long tarsi) of Colossendeis along with the type species. The other clade is the "brevitarsal group" (short tarsi). The following cladogram is based on the 2019 phylogenetic analysis of Colossendeidae genetics which recovered this treatment:

- - - - - - - - Colossendeis scotti
              - Colossendeis tortipaltis
            - - Decolopoda
              - Dodecolopoda mawsoni
          - - - Colossendeis angusta
              - Colossendeis scoresbii
            - Colossendeis megalonyx
        - - - - Colossendeis bouvetensis
              - Colossendeis wilsoni
            - Colossendeis robusta
          - Colossendeis drakei
      - Colossendeis proboscidea
    - Colossendeis australis
  - Colossendeis glacialis
- Colossendeis macerrima

== Sources ==
- PycnoBase: Taxon tree
