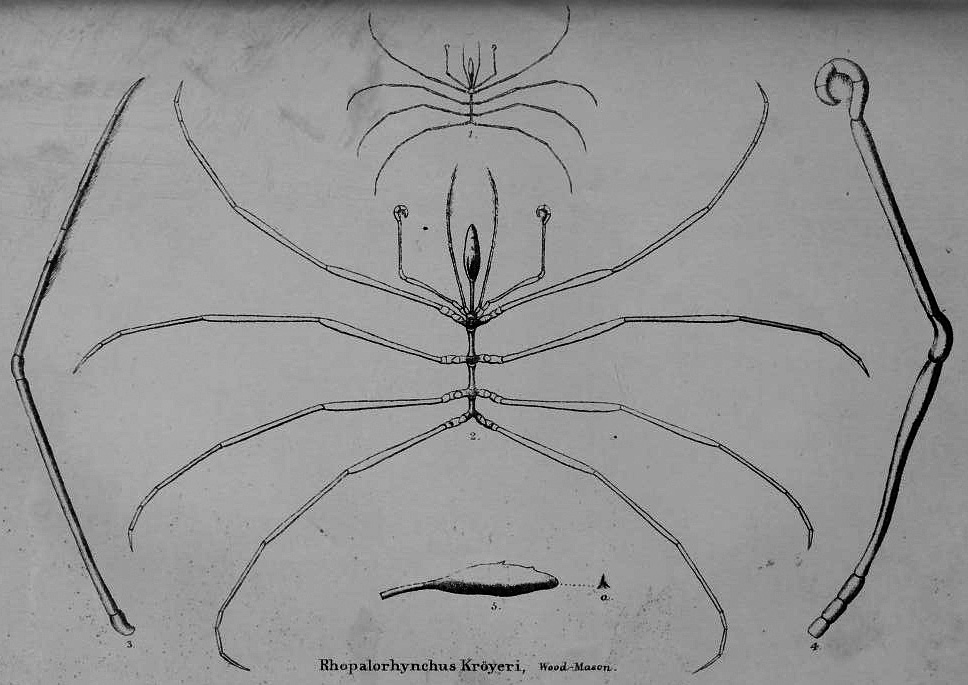
- Illustration of Rhopalorhynchus kroeyeri by Wood-Mason

Scientific classification
- Kingdom: Animalia
- Phylum: Arthropoda
- Subphylum: Chelicerata
- Class: Pycnogonida
- Order: Pantopoda
- Family: Colossendeidae
- Subfamily: Hedgpethiinae
- Genus: Rhopalorhynchus; Wood-Mason, 1873

= Rhopalorhynchus =

Genus of sea spiders

Rhopalorhynchus is a genus of sea spiders in the family Colossendeidae.

== Species ==
- Rhopalorhynchus cinculus Bamber, 2001
- Rhopalorhynchus claudes Stock, 1975
- Rhopalorhynchus clavipes Carpenter, 1893
- Rhopalorhynchus filipes Stock, 1991
- Rhopalorhynchus gracillimus Staples, 2009
- Rhopalorhynchus kroeyeri Wood-Mason, 1873
- Rhopalorhynchus lomani
- Rhopalorhynchus magdalena Stock, 1958
- Rhopalorhynchus mortenseni
- Rhopalorhynchus pedunculatus
- Rhopalorhynchus sibogae
- Rhopalorhynchus tenuissimus
