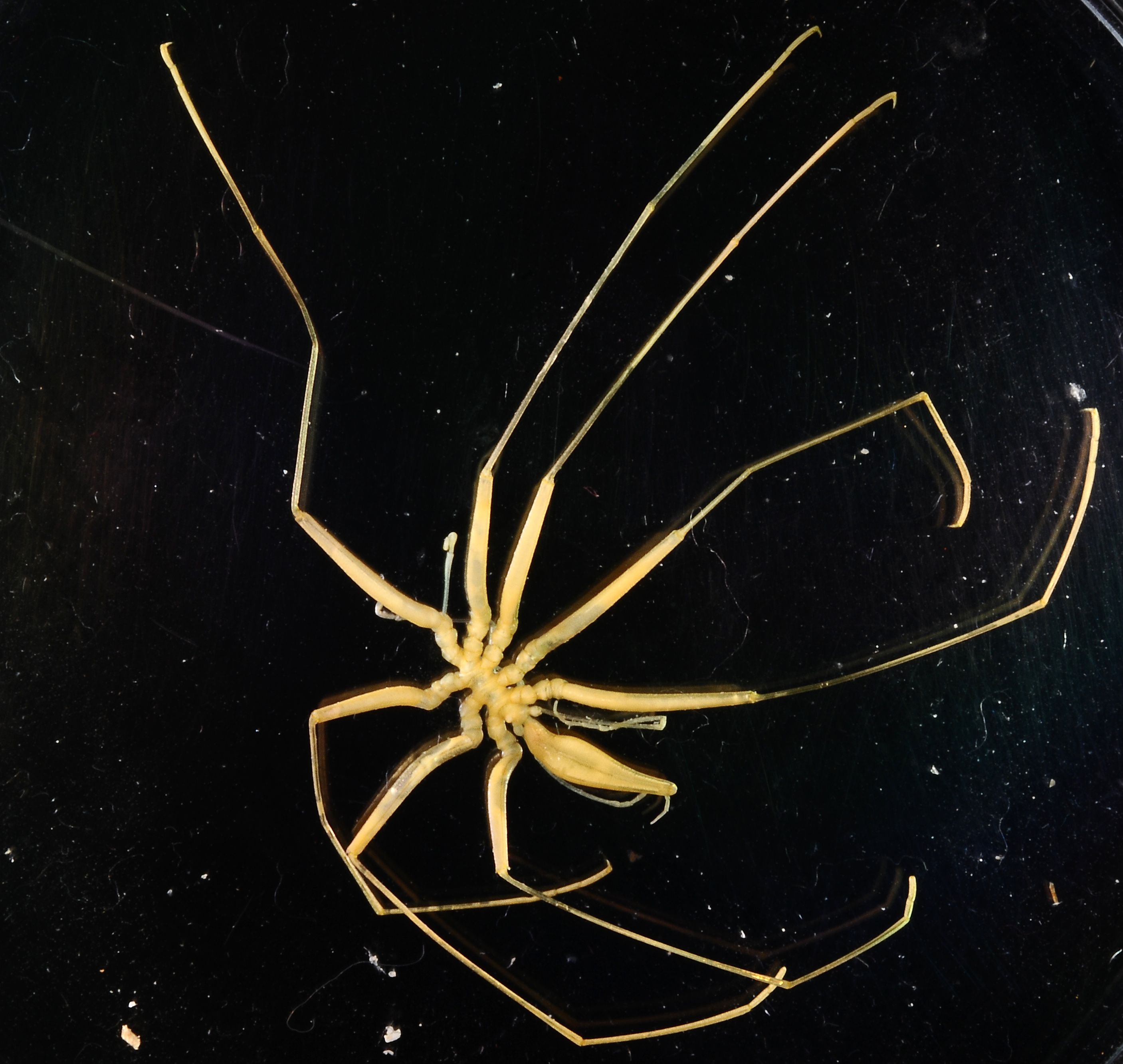
- Hedgpethia tibialis

Scientific classification
- Kingdom: Animalia
- Phylum: Arthropoda
- Subphylum: Chelicerata
- Class: Pycnogonida
- Order: Pantopoda
- Family: Colossendeidae
- Genus: Hedgpethia; Turpaeva, 1973

Species
- See text

Diversity
- 12 species

= Hedgpethia =

Genus of sea spiders

Hedgpethia is a genus of sea spiders in the family Colossendeidae. The genus was named after the marine biologist and sea spider specialist Joel Hedgpeth.

It includes the following species :

- Hedgpethia articulata Loman, 1908 — Flores Sea
- Hedgpethia atlantica (Stock, 1970) — Josephine Bank, Northwest Africa
- Hedgpethia bicornis Losina-Losinsky and Turpaeva, 1958 — Pacific Ocean: southeast of Kuril Islands, Okhotsk Sea
- Hedgpethia brevitarsis Losina-Losinsky and Turpaeva, 1958 — Okhotsk Sea
- Hedgpethia californica Hedgpeth, 1939 — Pacific Ocean: South California (in green mud)
- Hedgpethia caudata Turpaeva, 1993 — Pacific Ocean, 3,000 m deep
- Hedgpethia chitinosa Hilton, 1943 — Pacific Ocean: California coast
- Hedgpethia dampieri Child, 1975 — Indian Ocean: west of Lancelin Island, Australia
- Hedgpethia dofleini Loman, 1911 — Pacific Ocean: Misaki, Sagami Bay, Japan
- Hedgpethia magnirostris Arnaud and Child, 1988 — Indian Ocean: Zululand area, South Africa
- Hedgpethia nasica Child, 1994 — Pacific Ocean: west of Point Arguelo, California (on otter trawl)
- Hedgpethia tibialis Stock, 1991 — New Caledonia
