= Colossendeis proboscidea =

Scientific classification
- Kingdom: Animalia
- Phylum: Arthropoda
- Subphylum: Chelicerata
- Class: Pycnogonida
- Order: Pantopoda
- Family: Colossendeidae
- Genus: Colossendeis
- Species: C. proboscidea

Binomial name
- Colossendeis proboscidea (Sabine, 1824)

Synonyms
- Anomorhynchus smithii Miers, 1881; Colossendeis borealis Jarzynsky, 1870

Genus of sea spiders

Colossendeis proboscidea is a species of sea spider in the family Colossendeidae. It is native to the Arctic and northeast Atlantic.
