= Colossendeis acuta =

Scientific classification
- Kingdom: Animalia
- Phylum: Arthropoda
- Subphylum: Chelicerata
- Class: Pycnogonida
- Order: Pantopoda
- Family: Colossendeidae
- Genus: Colossendeis
- Species: C. acuta

Binomial name
- Colossendeis acuta Stiboy-Risch, 1993

Species of sea spider

Colossendeis acuta is a sea spider that occurs in deep-sea habitats in the Antarctic Pacific. The species shows sexual dimorphism and the eggs are brooded by the male.
