= Colossendeis belekurovi =

Scientific classification
- Kingdom: Animalia
- Phylum: Arthropoda
- Subphylum: Chelicerata
- Class: Pycnogonida
- Order: Pantopoda
- Family: Colossendeidae
- Genus: Colossendeis
- Species: C. belekurovi

Binomial name
- Colossendeis belekurovi Pushkin, 1993

Species of sea spider

Colossendeis belekurovi is a species of sea spider (class Pycnogonida) belonging to the family Colossendeidae. The species was first described by Pushkin in 1993.
