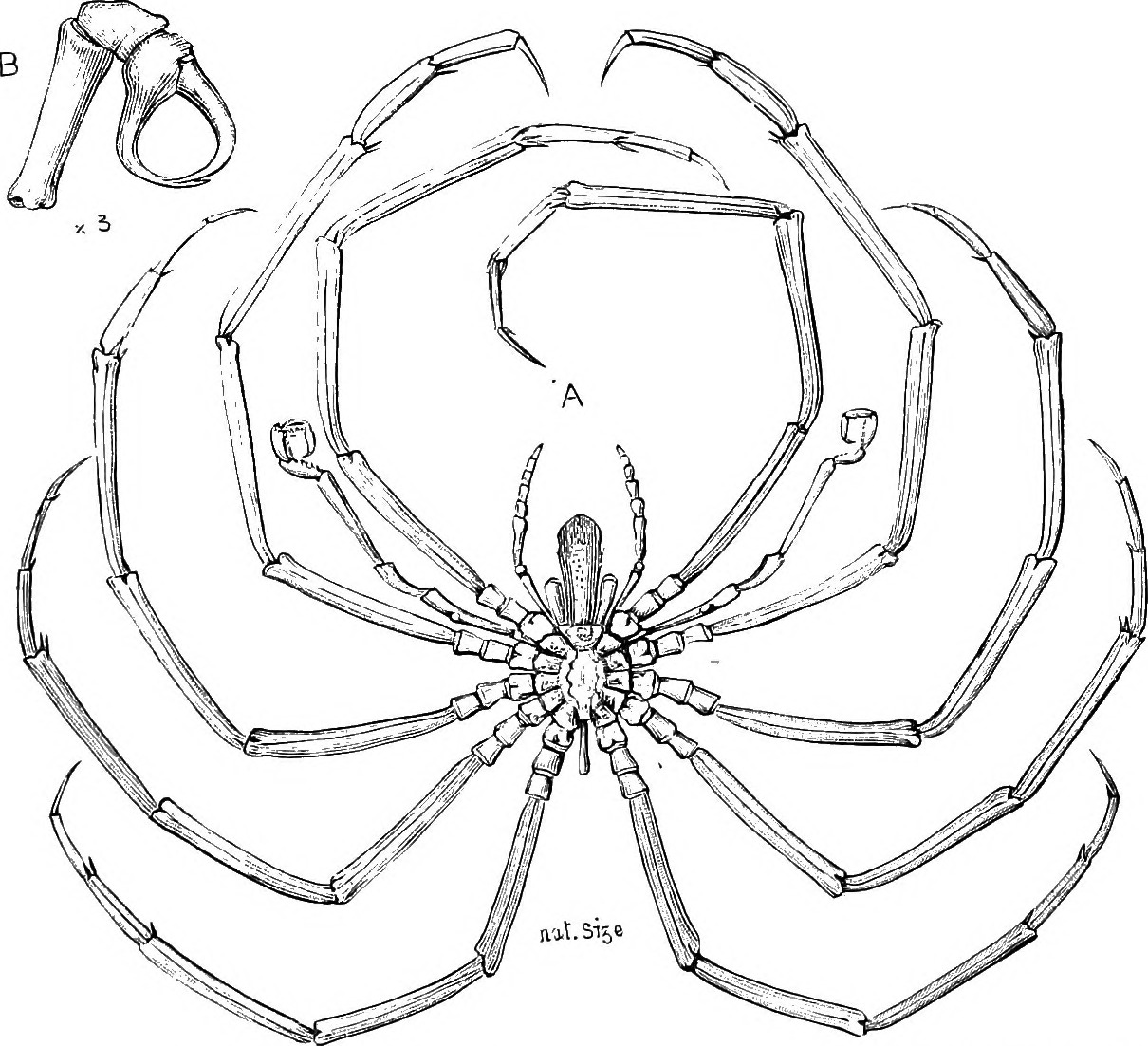
- Illustration of D. australis, from a specimen found at the South Shetlands by the Scotia Expedition.

Scientific classification
- Kingdom: Animalia
- Phylum: Arthropoda
- Subphylum: Chelicerata
- Class: Pycnogonida
- Order: Pantopoda
- Family: Colossendeidae
- Genus: Decolopoda; Eights, 1835

Species
- Decolopoda australis; Decolopoda qasimi

= Decolopoda =

Genus of sea spiders

Decolopoda is a genus of sea spider (class Pycnogonida) in the family Colossendeidae. This genus includes two valid species, D. australis and D. qasimi. As the name of this genus implies, these two species are among the seven species of sea spider with five pairs of legs in adults instead of the usual four leg pairs. The species D. australis is notable as the first polymerous (i.e., extra-legged) sea spider to be discovered.

== Discovery and taxonomy ==
The species D. australis was first described by the American naturalist James Eights in 1834. He based the original description of this species on specimens found in the sea along the South Shetland Islands in the Antarctic region. Naturalists mostly ignored his discovery, dismissing the description by Eights as erroneous or based on a monstrosity, until the discovery of more ten-legged species several decades later.

In 1905, the French zoologist Eugène-Louis Bouvier described one of these sea spiders as a new species, D. antarctica. In 1969, however, the American marine biologist Joel W. Hedgpeth and the British zoologist William G. Fry deemed D. antarctica to be a junior synonym of D. australis. Authorities now consider these sea spiders to be the same species.

Another species in this genus, D. qasimi, was described by V. Jaya Sree, R.A. Sreepada, and A.H. Parulekar of the National Institute of Oceanography in India in 1993. The original description of this species is based on a male holotype found at a depth of 150 m off the coast of Queen Maud Land in Antarctica. This species is named for the Indian marine biologist Syed Zahoor Qasim.

== Phylogeny ==
Phylogenetic analysis based on molecular data places Decolopoda in a clade with the twelve-legged sea spiders in the genus Dodecolopoda, which emerge as the closest relatives of Decolopoda. The molecular evidence also indicates that both species of Decolopoda as well as the genus Dodecolopoda are nested within the eight-legged genus Colossendeis in a phylogenetic tree. Thus, Colossendeis is paraphyletic with respect to these two polymerous (i.e., extra-legged) genera. This paraphyly would normally make both Dodecolopoda and Colossendeis junior synonyms of Decolopoda, the oldest name, and require all three genera to merge under the name Decolopoda. To avoid this disruption, authorities keep these genera under different names and retain Colossendeis as a paraphyletic genus.

The molecular evidence also indicates that the polymerous clade including Decolopoda and Dodecolopoda is nested within a monophyletic group containing the "longitarsal" species in the genus Colossendeis. The sea spiders in this "longitarsal" clade feature legs in which the three most distal articles (claw, propodus, and tarsus) taken together are at least three-quarters the length of the fourth most distal article (second tibia). In "brevitarsal" species of Colossendeis, the three distal articles are instead much shorter relative to the second tibia.

== Description ==
Adults of the giant species Decolopoda australis are bright scarlet and have five pairs of legs. These legs are about the same length except for the last pair, which are smaller. These sea spiders often weigh more than 10 g, and their legs span more than 20 cm. The holotype for the species Decolopoda qasimi is dark maroon (when preserved) and has ten legs that are all the same length. This species has even longer legs (184.7 mm long in the holotype) than those found in Decolopoda australis (100 mm long in the largest specimen).

Unlike the species Decolopoda australis, the species Decolopoda qasimi features hair only on its legs. The species Decolopoda australis usually features few setae but includes a variety that is hirsute. Setae cover the entire body of the hirsute variety except for the front half of the trunk and the base of the proboscis.

The polymerous genera Decolopoda and Dodecolopoda both resemble their eight-legged relatives in the genus Colossendeis. All three genera feature long legs and a long proboscis, traits that place them in the same family. The proboscis in each Decolopoda species, for example, is longer than the trunk. Furthermore, the genus Decolopoda also features longitarsal legs, like those found in its closest relatives in the genus Colessendeis: The three most distal articles of a representative leg of Decolopoda qasimi, for example, taken together are longer than the second tibia.

The polymerous genera Decolopoda and Dodecolopoda both differ from their close relatives in the genus Colessendeis not only by featuring more legs but also by retaining chelifores as adults. Adults in the genus Colessendeis lack chelifores. Furthermore, both Decolopoda and Dodecolopoda feature unusual chelae on their chelifores in that the dorsal finger moves while the ventral finger is immobile; in the chelifores of all other sea spiders, the ventral finger moves, and the dorsal finger is immobile.

The closely related genera Decolopoda and Dodecolopoda share other distinctive traits. For example, both genera feature a long proboscis that curves downward and is distally inflated. Furthermore, both genera feature legs in which the third most distal article (tarsus) is much longer than the second most distal article (propodus).

The sea spiders in Dodecolopoda not only have more legs, however, but also are larger than the species in Decolopoda. Furthermore, in Decolopoda, the most distal leg article (claw) is longer relative to the propodus, and the propodus is longer relative to the tarsus, compared to the corresponding articles in Dodecolopoda. In a representative leg in either species of Decolopoda, the claw is more than half as long as the propodus, which is more than half as long as the tarsus. In a representative leg in Dodecolopoda, however, the claw is less than half as long as the propodus, which is less than half as long as the tarsus.

== Locomotion ==
While walking, Decolopoda australis moves its legs in a metachronal pattern, with the movements of each leg lasting for a nearly equal amount of time and these strokes moving in regular waves along the body. This sea spider, like its close relatives in the genus Dodecolopoda, uses all of its legs in walking with a metachronal rhythm. These polymerous species walk with more coordination and precision than eight-legged sea spiders, which use a more casual gait. Octopodous sea spiders with long legs exhibit a more imprecise gait, lifting some legs or letting them drag while other legs take steps for several cycles, with strokes of irregular duration and legs sometimes overlapping or tangling with each other.

== Distribution ==
Both species in this genus are found in the Southern Ocean and are endemic to the Antarctic region. The species Decolopoda australis is a common sea spider with a circumpolar distribution. This sea spider has been collected from many Antarctic and sub-Antarctic locations, from the Ross Sea to Heard Island in the Indian Ocean, and at a wide range of depths, from littoral to 1890 m below the surface. This species has been recorded in Antarctic waters in the Scotia Sea, off the Antarctic Peninsula, in the Bellinghausen Sea, and in the Weddell Sea, as well as in sub-Antarctic waters near the Kerguelen Islands. The species Decolopoda qasimi is found in Subantarctic waters near the Crozet Islands at a depth of 150 m below the surface.
