= Hoover Elementary School =

There are a number of elementary schools named Hoover Elementary School:

- Hoover Elementary School (Westminster, California)
- Hoover Elementary School (Santa Ana, California)
- Hoover Elementary School (Corvallis, Oregon)
