= Shuford–Hoover House =

Historic house in North Carolina, United States

- Shuford-Hoover House
- U.S. National Register of Historic Places
- Location within North Carolina Location within the United States
- Location: (0.080 km) south of the junction with SR 10, near Blackburn, North Carolina
- Coordinates: 35°37′24″N 81°19′16″W
- Area: 3.2 acres (1.3 ha)
- Built: c. 1790, c. 1840, c. 1925
- Architectural style: Greek Revival, Federal
- MPS: Catawba County MPS
- NRHP reference No.: 90000743
- Added to NRHP: May 10, 1990

Shuford–Hoover House is a historic home located near Blackburn, Catawba County, North Carolina. The original section was built about 1790, and is a one-story, weatherboarded log structure. The front section was added about 1840, and is a one-story frame cottage in a transitional Federal / Greek Revival style. The two sections are linked together by a center porch-like room added about 1925.

It was listed on the National Register of Historic Places in 1990.
