= Windhover =

Windhover may refer to:

- Common kestrel (Falco tinnunculus), a bird of prey species
- "The Windhover", a 1877 poem by Gerard Manley Hopkins
- Saro Windhover, an amphibious aircraft
- USS Windhover (ASR-18), a planned ship that was cancelled in 1945
- Windhover (clipper ship), a tea clipper built in 1868
