= Metachronal swimming =

Swimming technique of multi-legged animals

A metachronal swimming or metachronal rowing is the swimming technique used by animals with multiple pairs of swimming legs. In this technique, appendages are sequentially stroked in a back-to-front wave moving along the animal's body. In literature, while metachronal rhythm or metachronal wave usually refer to the movement of cilia; metachronal coordination, metachronal beating, metachronal swimming or metachronal rowing usually refer to the leg movement of arthropods, such as mantis shrimp, copepods, antarctic krill etc. though all of them refer to the similar locomotion pattern.

Metachronous indicates something not functioning or occurring synchronously, or occurring or starting at different times. This word is derived from Greek meta- μετά- meaning, occurring later than or in succession to : after, and -chronous -Χρόνος meaning, of (such) a time or period.

Swimming legs should coordinate to avoid interference among appendage pairs. To accomplish this challenge, almost all free-swimming crustaceans adapted to some version of metachronism.

== Significance ==
Ecologically and economically important crustaceans such as copepods, krill, shrimp, crayfish, and lobsters use metachronal swimming for locomotion. Using this technique, animals propel a significant portion of earth's aquatic biomass. As an example, the biomass of a sole metachronally swimming species, the Antarctic krill Euphausia superba, is more than the total adult human biomass. Moreover, this technique is important from biomechanics point of view because it has been adapted to perform extreme swimming actions. The highest animal acceleration of 200 m/s^2, for example, belongs to the escape jump of the copepod Calanus finmarchicus. On the other hand, Antarctic krill uses metachronal swimming to efficiently migrate distances up to 10 km per day.

It is believed that during the power stroke appendages are subject to drag which creates forward thrust, while during the recovery stroke appendages are folded towards body to reduce the drag. Furthermore, back-to-front swimming pattern is thought to be more efficient than front-to-back or synchronous pattern.

== Examples from nature ==
=== Cilia in metazoa ===
Knight-Jones defines the types of metachronism in ciliary beat of metazoa depending on the relative direction of wave to the effective beat. If the effective beat is in the same direction as metachronal wave, then it is called as symplectic metachronal wave. If opposite, the wave is called antiplectic. There are cases where the wave is directed to the right or to the left of the effective beat. In these cases the metachronal wave is called dexioplectic if effective beat is to the right of the wave, and laeoplectic if effective beat is to the left of the wave.

=== Mantis shrimp ===
Mantis shrimp have five pairs of pleopods which they use to swim. Kinematics of their swimming reveals a metachronal pattern. A study by Campos et al. showed that the power stroke of the mantis shrimp (Odontodactylus havanensis) is metachronal, creating a back-to-front wave motion. While the power stroke is completed metachronally, the recovery stroke occurs nearly synchronously. The same rowing pattern was observed by another study. Stein et al. also report the metachronal rowing in mantis shrimp in their study

=== Copepods ===
Metachronism in copepods was observed by numerous studies. Copepods show metachronal beating pattern while foraging and escape movements. In this study by van Duren and Videler, it was observed that during foraging, copepods metachronally beat their first three mouth appendages (antennae, mandibular palps and maxillules) creating backward motion of water. During escape, their mouth appendages stop moving and swimming legs beat in a very fast metachronal rhythm, accelerating a jet of water backwards.

Slow-motion video by Jiang and Kiorboe reveals the metachronal beating of legs of cyclopoid copepod Oithona davisae during jumping. In this video, last pair of legs initiate the power stroke followed by the adjacent pair. Power stroke ends with the first pair. While power stroke is metachronal, recovery stroke is near synchronous.

=== Antarctic krill ===
Antarctic krill swim in a metachronal rhythm. They use several swimming modes, including hovering, fast-forward swimming and upside-down swimming, with differing kinematics. Hovering (HOV), is the swimming mode corresponding to body angles between 25 and 50°, with normalized speeds of less than half a body length per second (BL/s). HOV is performed at lower pleopod amplitudes and lower beat frequencies when compared to fast-forward swimming (FFW). FFW corresponds to speeds higher than 2 BL/s, independent of body angles. Typical swimming speeds are around 0.25, 4 and 1.6 BL/s, and typical beat frequencies are 3, 6.2 and 3.8 Hz for hovering, fast-forward swimming and upside-down swimming, respectively.

Metachronal rowing aids Antarctic krill to travel long distances, which they do both horizontally and vertically during diel vertical migration. Metachronal rhythms produce larger average propulsion velocities compared to more synchronous rhythms. It has also been shown that krill produce lift to balance the force acting on them as a result of negative buoyancy, allowing them to swim forward while maintaining their position in the water column.

== Bio-inspired robotics ==
Metachronal swimmers have inspired solutions for underwater locomotion in the intermediate Reynolds number regime due to their high maneuverability. Model organisms used to inspired designs include krill, ctenophores (comb jelly), and copepods. Bio-inspired robots can be used to find design solutions for underwater locomotion, as well as give greater insight into their model organism. Robotic models allow for parameter variations that live organisms don't, which gives us the opportunity to explore solutions outside of nature imposed boundaries. A shrimp-inspired metachronal robot can be used to study and understand the flexural asymmetry of shrimp pleopods, and their influence on efficiency and propulsion.

== See also ==
- Metachronal rhythm
