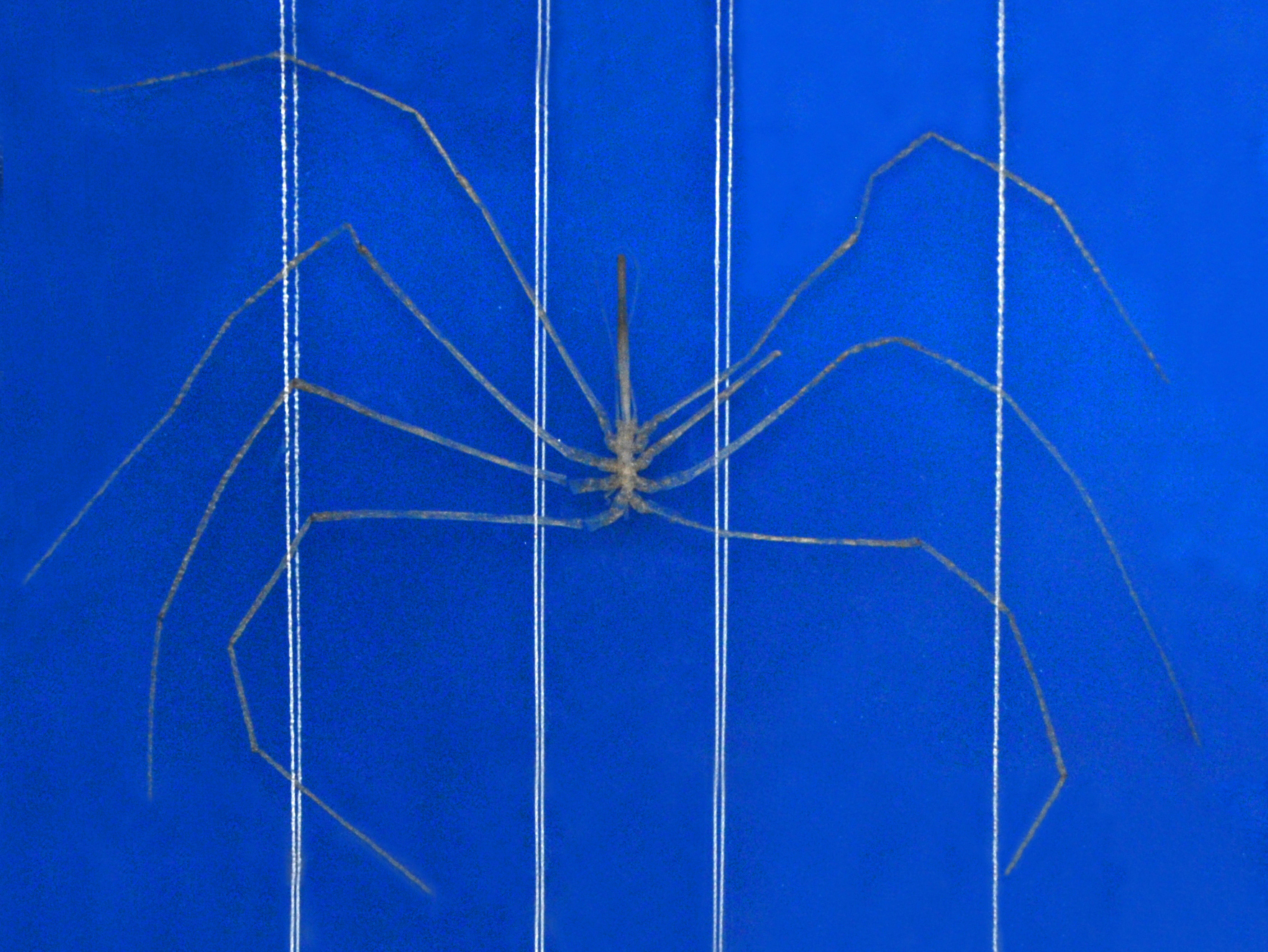
- Colossendeis macerrima from Atlantic Ocean. Museum specimen

Scientific classification
- Kingdom: Animalia
- Phylum: Arthropoda
- Subphylum: Chelicerata
- Class: Pycnogonida
- Order: Pantopoda
- Family: Colossendeidae
- Genus: Colossendeis; Jarzinsky, 1870

= Colossendeis =

Genus of sea spiders

Colossendeis is a genus of sea spider (class Pycnogonida) belonging to the family Colossendeidae. These sea spiders are typically found in the deep sea. This genus includes the largest pycnogonids, with leg spans frequently ranging from 40 to 50 cm (16-20 in). The largest sea spider, Colossendeis colossea, can reach a leg span of 70 cm (28 in). This genus also includes some bioluminescent sea spiders.

== Description ==
Sea spiders in this genus feature an unsegmented trunk, a low ocular tubercle, and a well-developed abdomen. Chelifores are absent in adults. The palps and ovigers touch at their bases, and the strigilis is tightly curved with a strong terminal claw. Species in this genus have only four pairs of legs. The ventral surface of the second most proximal article (second coxa) of some or all of these legs features tiny genital pores.

== Feeding ==
Sea spiders in this genus feed on cnidarians, sponges, bryozoans, small mollusks, and small polychaetes.

== Phylogeny ==
Although all species in this genus are eight-legged, phylogenetic analysis based on molecular data indicates that this genus is paraphyletic with respect to the ten-legged genus Decolopoda and the twelve-legged genus Dodecolopoda; these two polymerous (extra-legged) genera are nested within the genus Colossendeis in a phylogenetic tree. This paraphyly would normally make both Dodecolopoda and Colossendeis junior synonyms of Decolopoda, the oldest name, and require all three genera to merge under the name Decolopoda. To avoid this disruption, authorities keep these genera under different names and retain Colossendeis as a paraphyletic genus.

The molecular evidence also indicates that both Decolopoda and Dodecolopoda are nested within a monophyletic group containing the "longitarsal" species in the genus Colossendeis. The sea spiders in this "longitarsal" clade feature legs in which the three most distal articles (claw, propodus, and tarsus) taken together are at least three-quarters the length of the fourth most distal article (second tibia). This clade includes not only Antarctic species of Colossendeis such as C. australis and C. glacialis but also widespread taxa such as C. megalonyx and C. robusta. In "brevitarsal" species, such as C. macerrima, the three most distal articles are instead much shorter relative to the second tibia.

== Species ==
There are 72 species:

- Colossendeis acuta Stiboy-Risch, 1993
- Colossendeis adelpha Child, 1998
- Colossendeis angusta Sars, 1877
- Colossendeis aperta Turpaeva, 2005
- Colossendeis arcanus Turpaeva, 2008
- Colossendeis arcuata A. Milne-Edwards, 1885
- Colossendeis australis Hodgson, 1907
- Colossendeis avidus Pushkin, 1970
- Colossendeis belekurovi Pushkin, 1993
- Colossendeis bicincta Schimkewitsch, 1893
- Colossendeis bouvetensis Dietz, Pieper, Seefeldt & Leese, 2015
- Colossendeis brevirostris Child, 1995
- Colossendeis bruuni Fage, 1956
- Colossendeis clavata Meinert, 1899
- Colossendeis colossea Wilson, 1881
- Colossendeis concedis Child, 1995
- Colossendeis cucurbita Cole, 1909
- Colossendeis curtirostris Stock, 1963
- Colossendeis dalli Child, 1995
- Colossendeis drakei Calman, 1915
- Colossendeis elephantis Child, 1995
- Colossendeis enigmatica Turpaeva, 1974
- Colossendeis ensifer Child, 1995
- Colossendeis fijigrypos Bamber, 2004
- Colossendeis fragilis Pushkin, 1993
- Colossendeis gardineri Carpenter, 1907
- Colossendeis geoffroyi Mane-Garzon, 1944
- Colossendeis glacialis Hodgson, 1907
- Colossendeis gracilis Hoek, 1881
- Colossendeis grassus Pushkin, 1993
- Colossendeis hoeki Gordon, 1944
- Colossendeis insolitus Pushkin, 1993
- Colossendeis korotkevitschi Pushkin, 1984
- Colossendeis kurtchatovi Turpaeva, 1993
- Colossendeis leniensis Pushkin, 1993
- Colossendeis leptorhynchus Hoek, 1881
- Colossendeis longirostris Gordon, 1938
- Colossendeis losinskii Turpaeva, 2002
- Colossendeis macerrima Wilson, 1881
- Colossendeis media Hoek, 1881
- Colossendeis megalonyx Hoek, 1881
- Colossendeis melancholicus Stock, 1975
- Colossendeis mica Pushkin, 1970
- Colossendeis microsetosa Hilton, 1943
- Colossendeis minor Schimkewitsch, 1893
- Colossendeis minuta Hoek, 1881
- Colossendeis mycterismos Bamber, 2004
- Colossendeis nasuta Hedgpeth, 1949
- Colossendeis notialis Child, 1995
- Colossendeis oculifera Stock, 1963
- Colossendeis peloria Child, 1994
- Colossendeis perforata Turpaeva, 1993
- Colossendeis pipetta Stock, 1991
- Colossendeis potentis Turpaeva, 2008
- Colossendeis proboscidea (Sabine, 1824)
- Colossendeis pseudochelata Pushkin, 1993
- Colossendeis robusta Hoek, 1881
- Colossendeis rostrata Turpaeva, 1994
- Colossendeis scoresbii Gordon, 1932
- Colossendeis scotti Calman, 1915
- Colossendeis sinuosa Stock, 1997
- Colossendeis spicula Child, 1994
- Colossendeis stramenti Fry & Hedgpeth, 1969
- Colossendeis subminuta Schimkewitsch, 1893
- Colossendeis tasmanica Staples, 2007
- Colossendeis tenera Hilton, 1943
- Colossendeis tenuipedis Pushkin, 1993
- Colossendeis tethya Turpaeva, 1974
- Colossendeis tortipalpis Gordon, 1932
- Colossendeis vityazi Turpaeva, 1973
- Colossendeis weddellensis Turpaeva, 2008
- Colossendeis wilsoni Calman, 1915
