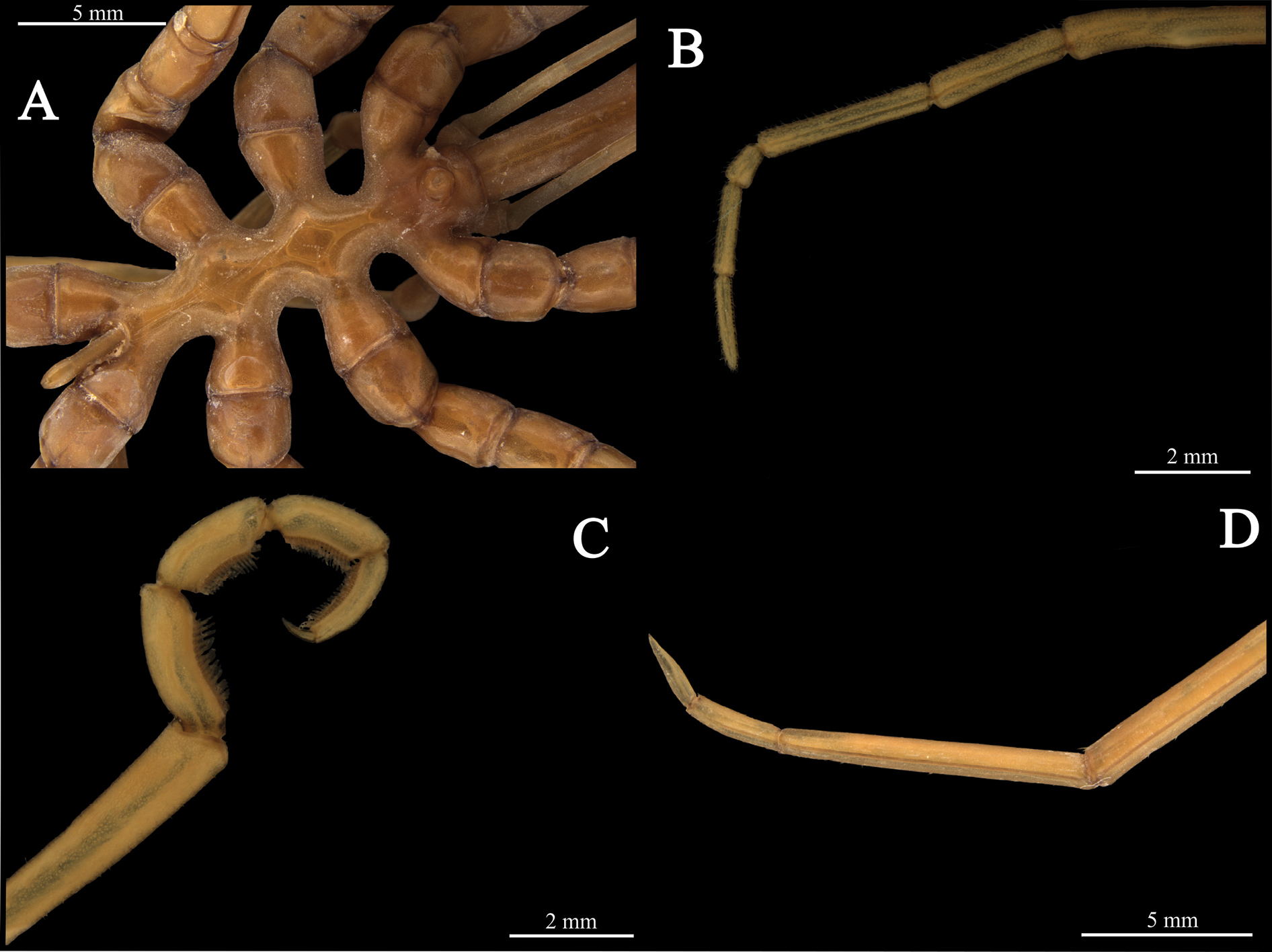

Scientific classification
- Kingdom: Animalia
- Phylum: Arthropoda
- Subphylum: Chelicerata
- Class: Pycnogonida
- Order: Pantopoda
- Family: Colossendeidae
- Genus: Colossendeis
- Species: C. megalonyx

Binomial name
- Colossendeis megalonyx Hoek, 1881

= Colossendeis megalonyx =

Species of sea spider

Colossendeis megalonyx is a species of pycnogonids, also known as sea spiders, in the family Colossendeidae. The species was first described by Dutch zoologist Dr. Paulus Peronius Cato Hoek after his voyage on HMS Challenger from 1873-1876.

== Etymology ==
The name stems from the Latin word Colossus, meaning huge, and the derived Greek name, endeis, meaning 'in the earth'. Megalonyx is a Greek word that translates to great claw.

== Taxonomy ==
Colossendeis megalonyx is a member of the genus Colossendeis and belongs to the Colossendeidae family. Colossendeidae exhibit apomorphies such as cephalization through the anterior migration of trunk ganglia and loss of chelifores. Further speciation of C. Megalonyx has been proposed due to its high morphological variability and wide distribution.

== Description ==
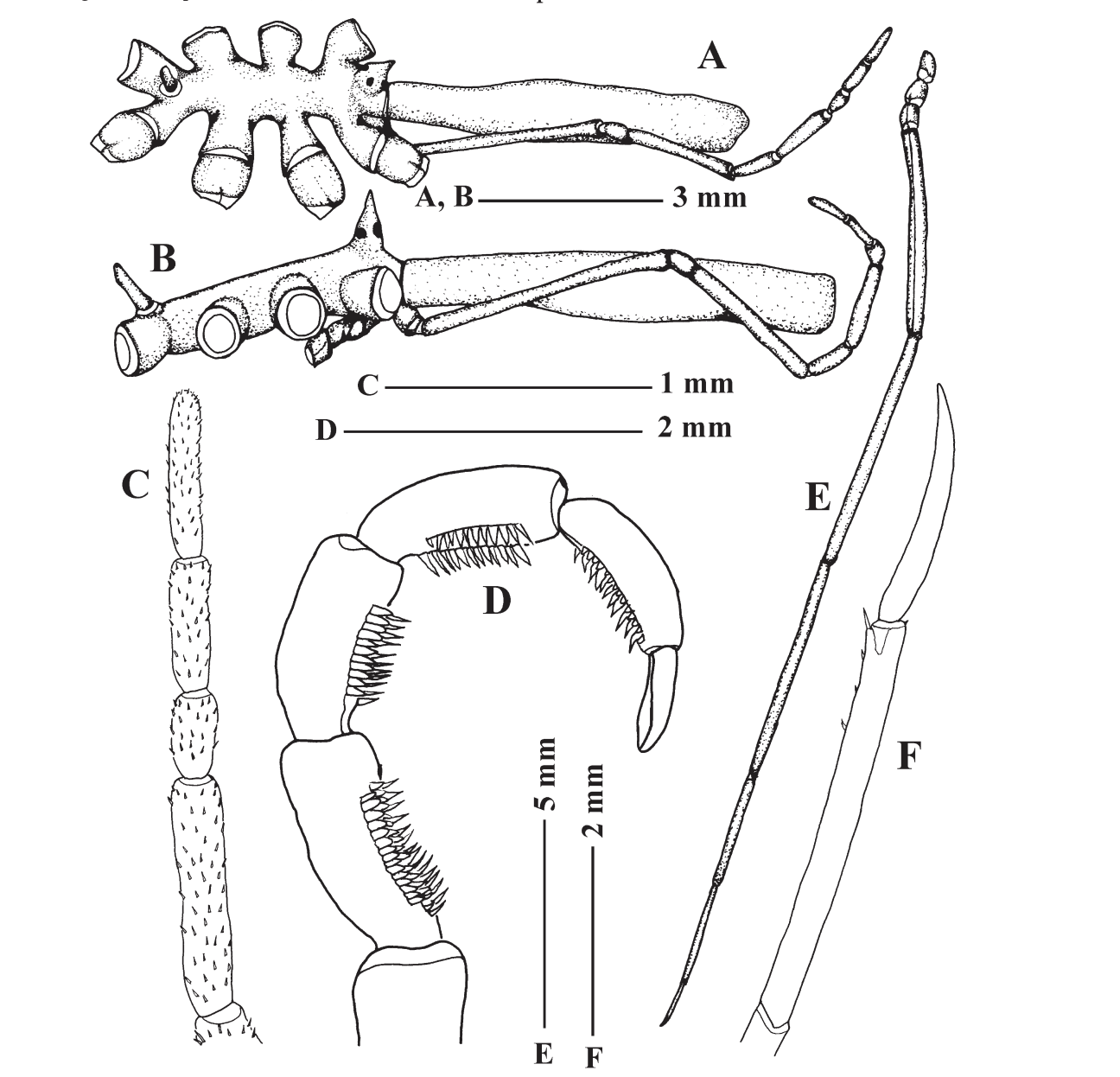
Colossendeis megalonyx anatomy. A, dorsal view of body; B, lateral view of body; C, distal segments of palp; D, strigilis; E, third leg of right side; F, distal leg segments

Colossendeis megalonyx is characterized by its long proboscis, reaching up to about twice its trunk size as an adult. Although C. megalonyx belongs to the subphylum Chelicerata, it has no chelifores in its adult form. The pycnogonid has four sets of walking legs attached to a four-segmented trunk through sets of extrinsic muscle bands. The appendages are sparsely covered in tiny setae. There are gonopores on all the legs. C. megalonyx has 10-segmented palps and ovigers connected to the body by muscle bands. Palps are homologous to pedipalps in arachnids and are used to manipulate prey. Ovigers are modified legs that are used to clean the walking legs. At the end of the ovigers are slightly curved, spatulate terminal claws. C. megalonyx's ovigers are unique as the distal articles, also known as strigilis, have six rows of compound spines specialized for cleaning. Cleaning is essential for large species of pycnogonids, such as C. megalonyx, as they can house large numbers of epibionts like bryozoans and algae. C. megalonyx has an anterior pair and a posterior pair of simple eye forms called ocelli. The four ocelli sit on a cone-shaped mound called the ocular tubercle. C. megalonyx can vary in colour but typically exhibits shades of orange, yellow, and cream.

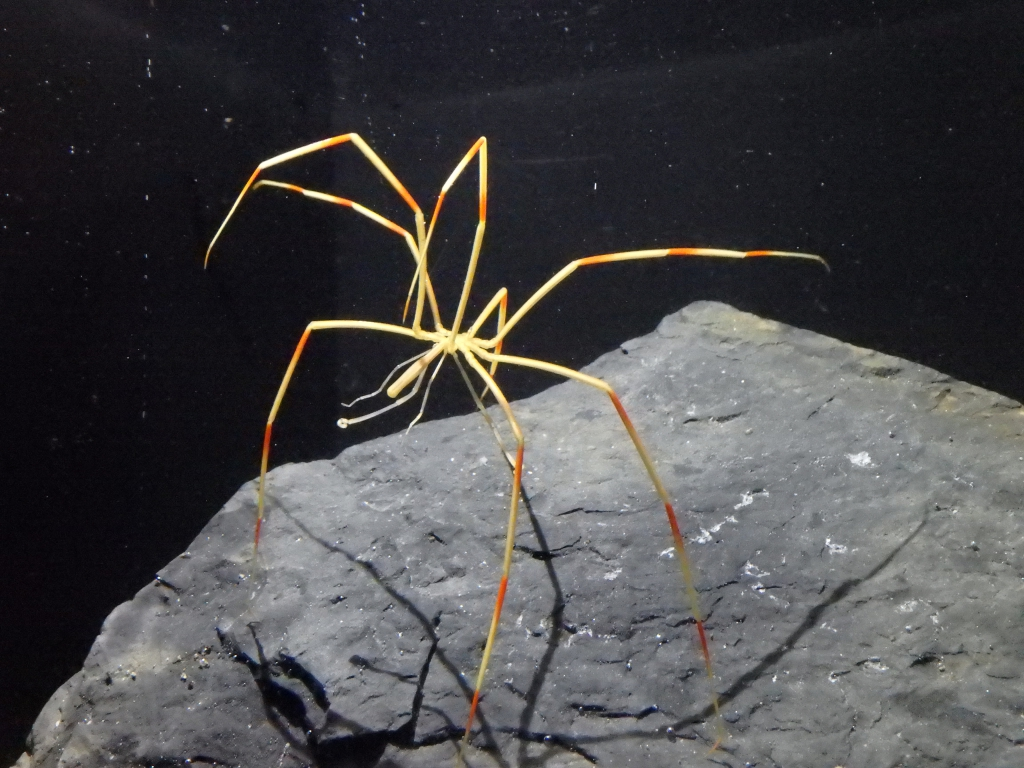
Photograph of C. megalonyx sea spider on a rock.

=== Feeding ===
Colossendeis megalonyx is uncharacteristically active while hunting. They are a more mobile species of pycnogonids, capable of rapidly catching prey with their proboscis. C. megalonyx feeds on pelagic invertebrates such as pteropods, jellyfish, and ctenophores. This predation is uncommon among other studied pycnogonids, which usually feed on benthic organisms. C. megalonyx captures prey within its leg span by bending and striking with the tip of its proboscis. The pycnogonid then lifts its body back up to a standing position with the prey still speared by its proboscis. It feeds with its proboscis directly lodged into the prey and can take several hours to consume it entirely. The proboscis allows C. megalonyx to suck out the fluid and nutrients of its soft-bodied prey.

=== Respiration ===
Colossendeis megalonyx utilises its porous cuticle and large surface area-to-volume ratio to absorb oxygen and efficiently release carbon dioxide via diffusion. The oxygen is distributed through the movement of hemolymph and gut fluids via a dorsal heart in the trunk and peristaltic contractions of the gut that extend into the legs. Scientists have captured the heartbeat and peristaltic waves of a juvenile C. megalonyx on video. The cuticle porosity of C. Megalonyx is considerably higher than other species in its family. This high porosity may allow C. megalonyx to grow to larger sizes and be more mobile and active than its related species.

=== Reproduction ===
Colossendeidae exhibits minimal sexual dimorphism. Divers have observed Colossendeids stacked on top of each other in groups of 2-4, similar to mating postures exhibited by other pycnogonids. The reproduction and life cycle of the species C. megalonyx is notoriously understudied. C. megalonyx males have yet to be shown to brood eggs with their ovigers, unlike other pycnogonids. However, scientists observed the reproduction of C. megalonyx for the first time by capturing and monitoring mating groups at McMurdo Station, an American Antarctic research station. They housed the mating groups in a flow-through seawater system, checking them for eggs several times daily. The first eggs appeared in a gelatinous cloud around an individual spider. A parent exhibited post spawning care by consolidating the eggs and gluing them to substrate. An adult from the mating group stayed near the eggs for three days. During this time, the adult would groom and manipulate the egg mass with its appendages. The egg masses contained thousands of eggs. The first larvae hatched after eight months. The hatched larvae did not swim. Instead, they crawled slowly and exhibited negative buoyancy.

== Distribution ==
Colossendeis megalonyx occupies a wide range of depths from 3 to 5,000 m (9.8 to 16,404.2 ft). They are one of the most widely distributed species of sea spiders in the Southern Ocean, occupying shallower waters in the Antarctic to deeper waters in South America and South Africa.
