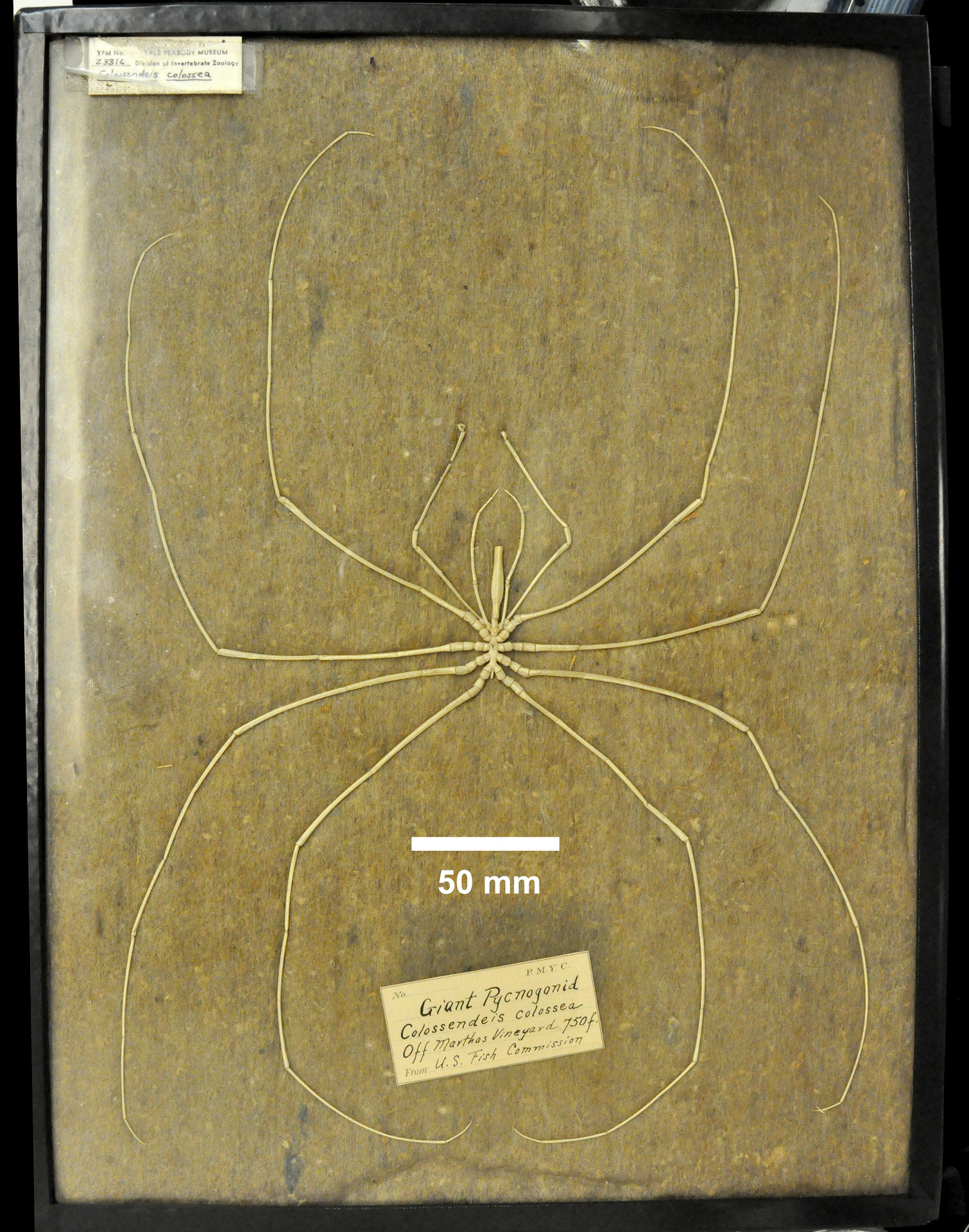

Scientific classification
- Kingdom: Animalia
- Phylum: Arthropoda
- Subphylum: Chelicerata
- Class: Pycnogonida
- Order: Pantopoda
- Family: Colossendeidae
- Genus: Colossendeis
- Species: C. colossea

Binomial name
- Colossendeis colossea Wilson, 1881

= Colossendeis colossea =

Species of sea spider

Colossendeis colossea is a species of sea spider (class Pycnogonida) in the family Colossendeidae. The species was first described by Edmund B. Wilson in 1881. It is the largest pycnogonid species known to science, reaching a leg span of 70 cm (28 in). Body length, including proboscis and abdomen, can reach 7 cm (2.8 in).

Colossendeis colossea is a deep-water species inhabiting continental slopes at depths between 420 and 5,200 m (1,380 and 17,060 ft) m. It has a semi-cosmopolitan distribution in all main oceans apart from the Arctic Ocean.
