= Eli Hoover House and Confectionary =

Historic house in Indiana, United States

- Eli Hoover House and Confectionery
- U.S. National Register of Historic Places
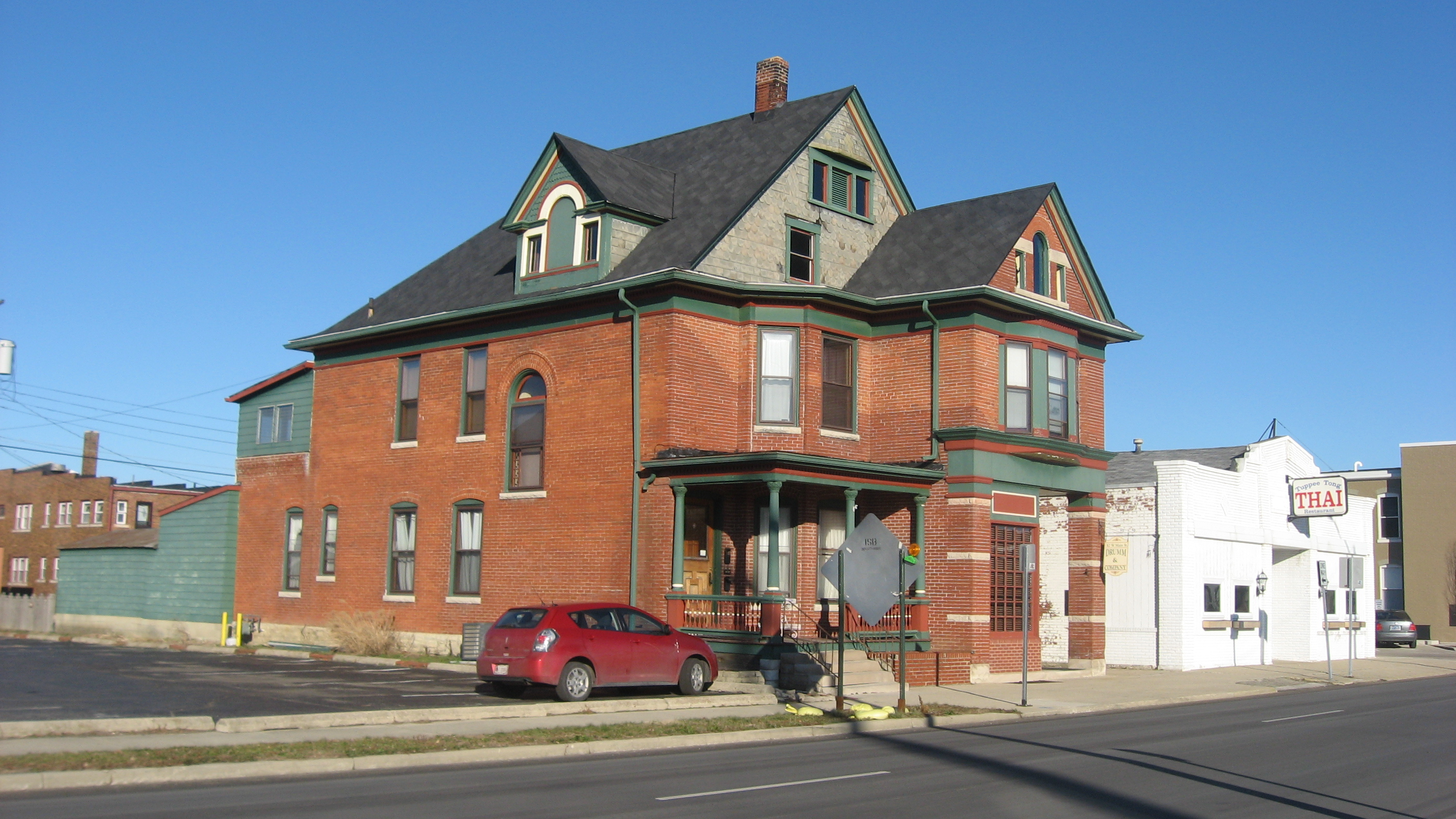
- Eli Hoover House, January 2012

- Location within Indiana Location within the United States
- Location: 316 W. Main St., Muncie, Indiana
- Coordinates: 40°11′38″N 85°23′21″W
- Area: less than one acre
- Built: 1899
- Architectural style: Queen Anne
- MPS: Downtown Muncie MRA
- NRHP reference No.: 88002128
- Added to NRHP: November 14, 1988

Eli Hoover House and Confectionery is a historic home and confectionery located at Muncie, Indiana. The house was built in 1899, and is a 2 1/2-story, Queen Anne style red brick dwelling with limestone detailing. It has a multiple gable roof, corner entrance, and slate fishscale shingles on the gable ends. It was originally built for residential and commercial purposes.

The building is named for the man who funded its construction, Eli Hoover, a member of one of Delaware County's "pioneer families." Hoover lived and did business in the home. Hoover was involved in the confectionery, cigar, and insurance industries. He was also active in local politics and belonged to the Odd Fellows and the Knights of Pythias.

It was added to the National Register of Historic Places in 1988.
