= Dorothy Haines Hoover =

Canadian artist

- Born: 1904; Toronto, Canada
- Died: 1995 (aged 90–91)
- Education: University of Toronto
- Known for: Painter
- Style: landscape oil paintings and still life scenes

Dorothy Haines Hoover (1904–1995) was a Canadian artist. She was born in Toronto, Ontario. Hoover earned a B.A. in Modern History at the University of Toronto in 1924 and began painting in the 1930s after learning from her father. She married G. L. J. Hoover in 1930. In 1947, she gave lectures in the Museum Research Studies at the Ontario College of Art (OCAD). From 1951 to 1969 she doubled as lecturer and head librarian at the college, and was also editor of the alumni newsletter. In 1987, as the first head librarian at OCAD, the Dorothy H. Hoover Library at the College was named in her honour.

She is known for her landscape oil paintings and still life scenes.
