= Metachronal rhythm =

Wavy movements produced by sequential action

Metachronally shimmering bees

Cilia bending in metachronal rhythm produce the appearance of a wave

Simulation of metachronal waves in the legs of a centipede

A metachronal rhythm or metachronal wave refers to wavy movements produced by the sequential action (as opposed to synchronized) of structures such as cilia, segments of worms, or legs. These movements produce the appearance of a travelling wave.

A Mexican wave is a large scale example of a metachronal wave. This pattern is found widely in nature such as on the cilia of many aquatic organisms such as ctenophores, molluscs, ciliates as well as on the epithelial surfaces of many body organs. Individual cilia, when part of a metachronal wave being used for protist locomotion, individually beat in a pattern similar to the planar stroke of a flagellum. The difference is that the recovery stroke is at 90 degrees to the power stroke, so that the cilia avoid hitting each other.

Metachronal rhythms may be seen in the coordinated movements of the legs of millipedes and other multi-legged land invertebrates, as well as in the coordinated movements of social insects.

Such metachronal motion has been shown to enhance fluid transport properties in natural cilia. Metachronal motion has also been replicated in synthetic microfluidic systems using magnetic filaments.

Apis laboriosa shimmering wave caught on camera (top left)

== See also ==
- Beta movement
- Phi phenomenon
- Autowave
