= Hoover High School =

Hoover High School may refer to:

- Herbert Hoover High School (Fresno, California)
- Herbert Hoover High School (Glendale), California
- Herbert Hoover High School (San Diego, California)
- Herbert Hoover High School (Iowa), in Des Moines, Iowa
- Herbert Hoover High School (West Virginia), in Clendenin, West Virginia
- Hoover High School (Alabama), Hoover, Alabama, made famous by the MTV show Two-A-Days
- Hoover High School (Ohio), North Canton, Ohio
